= Global Neighbourhood for Media Innovation =

Nonprofit organization in Karachi, Pakistan

Global Neighbourhood for Media Innovation (GNMI) is a Karachi-based nonprofit working for media development in Pakistan.

== History ==
GNMI was founded in 2017 by senior broadcast journalist and news anchor Najia Ashar.

== Work ==
GNMI provides a range of training and capacity building courses to journalists in Pakistan. Its main focus is to equip journalists with safety and security training as well as training in new media advancements and inclusive reporting.

GNMI launched the Pakistan Entrepreneurial Journalism Program in 2020 to promote entrepreneurial journalism among Pakistani journalists. It also established a virtual Media Incubation Centre And Acceleration Platform as a resource portal on entrepreneurial journalism in Pakistan.

GNMI also manages a thinktank called Media Baithak that aims to promote intellectual, cultural, and professional engagement between media and civil society.
