= International communication =

Academic discipline

International communication (also referred to as the study of global communication or transnational communication) is the communication practice that occurs across international borders. The need for international communication was due to the increasing effects and influences of globalization. As a field of study, international communication is a branch of communication studies, concerned with the scope of "government-to-government", "business-to-business", and "people-to-people" interactions at a global level. Currently, international communication is being taught at colleges worldwide. Due to the increasingly globalized market, employees who possess the ability to effectively communicate across cultures are in high demand. International communication "encompasses political, economic, social, cultural and military concerns".

== Historical context ==
=== Communication and empires ===
Efficient communication networks played crucial roles in establishing ancient imperial authority and international trade. The extent of empire could be used as an 'indication of the efficiency of communication'. Ancient empires such as Rome, Persia, Axum and China, all utilized writing in collecting information and dispersing, creating enormous postal and dispatch systems. As early as in fifteenth century, news had been disseminated trans-nationally in Europe. "The wheat traders of Venice, the silver traders of Antwerp, the merchants of Nuremberg and their trading partners shared economic newsletters and created common values and beliefs in the rights of capital".

=== Advent of telegraph and time–space compression ===
In 1837, Samuel Morse invented the telegraph. The telegraph worked by transmitting electrical signals over a wire laid between stations. It was the first mode of communication to eliminate the effect of distance, allowing for a near instantaneous connection. Given its speed and reliability in delivering information, telegraph offered opportunities for capital and military expansion. It also increased market integration. It did so by lowering the cost of trade by increasing the capacity utilization of shipping. As showed in Table 1.1, the establishment of cable hardware signifies global power order in late nineteenth and early twentieth century.

Table 1.1 Cabling the world

	1892	1892	1923	1923
	length(km)	global share(%)	length(km)	global share(%)
British Empire	163,619	66.3	297,802	50.5
United States	38,986	15.8	142,621	24.2
French Empire	21,859	8.9	64,933	11.0
Denmark	13,201	5.3	15,590	2.6
Others	9206	3.7	68,282	11.7
All cables combined	246,871	100.0	589,228	100.0

=== Era of news agencies ===
The newspaper industry and international telegraph networks mutually facilitated each other. Telegraph communications drastically altered the way in which news was produced. The individual items of modern newspapers became no longer selected on the basis of spatial proximity, but following newly emerging journalistic criteria of news relevance. As the supply and demand of the newspaper industry rapidly increased in the nineteenth century, news agencies were established successively.

The French Havas Agency was founded in 1835, the German agency Wolffs Telegraphisches Bureau in 1849, and the British Reuters in 1851. These three European agencies began as financial-data services for bankers, but eventually started to operate internationally and extended their coverage to world news. They were all subsidized by their respective governments. By 1866, national news agencies were beginning to rise in many European countries. While they covered and sold news locally, they relied on the major services for coverage and sales abroad.

The global media and news agencies have played a fundamental role in contemporary globalization, making possible the feeling of instant communication and the experience of global connection. They have played a pioneering role in the use of new technologies, such as the telegraph, which have altered the nature of news. Technological innovation continues to be a major area of competition between global news agencies.

=== Radio broadcasting ===
Western countries seized the chances to implement radio communication after the first radio transmissions of human voice in 1902. But the two mechanisms of radio broadcasting were distinctively different. In the United States, the Radio Act of 1927 confirmed its status as an advertising-funded commercial enterprise, while in the United Kingdom, the public broadcasting pioneer British Broadcasting Corporation was set up in the same year. During the First World War and the Second World War, radio broadcasting played a significant role in both domestic public opinion management and international diplomacy propaganda abroad.

Even in the Cold War, this radio-dominated international communication still featured in propaganda respective ideologies. A prominent example is Voice of America, which ran a global network to indoctrinate the "American dream" to its international audience. Radio also played an important role in the ideological confrontation between the east and the west. Broadcasts could penetrate the "Iron Curtain" and directly address the "enemy", which was extremely important in the early days of the Cold War. Western broadcasting offered an alternative channel for the flow of new information and ideas. Around a one third of Soviet urban adults and about half of East European adults were regular listeners of Western broadcasts at the time.

Shortwave transmission sites, known as numbers stations, were used by both the United States and Soviet governments to send propaganda to foreign countries. They were also a secure method of sending coded messages to intelligence officers operating in other countries. As long as an agent had the station, the air time, and encryption code, he could receive a one-time message that only he could understand.

Not only Western countries have been impacted by communication through the use of radio broadcasting. An example of this is the 1994 Rwandan genocide. In April 1994, a plane carrying the presidents of Rwanda and neighboring Burundi crashed under mysterious circumstances. This sparked a mass killing spree that took place over the next three months and left over a million Rwandans dead. The Rwandan media have been accused of inciting hatred that led to violence by using an ethical framework to report a political struggle, as well as spreading fear, rumors, and panic. They also incited ordinary citizens to take part in the massacres. Through its broadcasts, the popular radio station Radio Télévision Libre des Mille Collines attracted unemployed youth and members of the Interahamwe, a far-right paramilitary organization.

=== Demanding a new communication order ===
Since the cold war officially ended in 1990, the intense relations of super powers halted with the collapse of the Soviet Union, and the emergence of the Third World countries, the unequally developed communication order can no longer exist. The Third World called for ceasing their marginalized communication status. Especially when international communications stepped into the information age, 'the convergence of telecommunication and computing and the ability to move all type of data – pictures, words, sounds – via the Internet have revolutionized international information exchange.' The New World Information and Communication Order debate changed the trajectory of international communication. This was a series of debates that happened in the 1980s about information flow across the world.

=== Considerations for international communication ===
When communicating internationally it is important to take culture into consideration. Though English has become the language of business, many businesses fail to recognize that the language used does not determine how business is conducted. Therefore, it is important to understand that intercultural and international communication are interchangeable. Effective communication between international business partners is critical for global success, and underlying national and organizational cultural differences in international business-related relationships can create hurdles to effective communication, which can hinder performance. The New World Information and Communication Order (NWICO) was one of the major shift in the history of international communication.

As a tourist it may be acceptable to maintain the cultural norms from a country of origin when visiting, though attempting to adapt would be appreciated. However, when conducting business it is important to recognize cultural differences, especially when communicating. At the turn of the century there was a large amount of research based on the needs of those that travel abroad in order to commercialize products or services. The list of researchers includes Hofstede, 1991; Storti, 1994; Ansari & Jackson, 1995; Cushner & Brislin, 1996; Adler, 1997; Mead, 1998; and Marx, 1999. From those studies Gibson's volume becomes an important source of information for business professionals interested in succeeding internationally. As explained by Douglas Storey, there was a change in style and strategy of American diplomacy since 1979 after the first addition of Glen Fisher's book appeared.

Despite the reason for international communication it is important to understand that international communication is not limited to the language spoken during communication.

There are two broadly conceived approaches to the creation of international communications regulations. The first would be internationalizing a minimum standard by agreement among the parties. The second is to allow the parties to denote exceptions for specific points about which they may be unable to reach agreement. Though the second approach falls short of uniformity it permits higher standards by allowing some parties to opt out.

== Scope and approaches of international communication research ==
International communication is widely spread and multilayered in contemporary society, however it is not considered as a separate academic discipline because of its overlapping with other subjects. International communication is 'a topic field rather than a discipline field' and international communication studies is a mode of 'organizing inquiry'.

John D. H. Downing proposed ten categories within which international communication should be conducted

1. theories of international communication
2. core international communication processes
3. global media firms
4. global media policies
5. Global news flows
6. world cinema
7. development communication
8. the Internet
9. intellectual property law
10. non-hegemonic communication flows

Mehdi Semati listed the wide range of research subjects in international communication, which includes, but not limited to the following.

- Communication and development(development communication)
- Technology transfer
- Development journalism
- Modernization theory
- Dependency theories
- Nation, nationalism, and national cultural
- State, nation-state, and sovereignty
- International relations and communication
- Global communicative access
- Cultural imperialism
- Media imperialism
- Transnational corporations, transnational media corporations
- International organizations and communication
- International television and radio broadcasting
- Broadcasting and propaganda
- Theories of the press
- Free flow of information
- International traffic in media content
- Global news flow
- International news agencies
- Trans-border data flow
- International (tele) communication technology
- International (tele) communication policy and regulation
- Cross-cultural media receptions studies
- Globalization

Hamid Mowlana stated four key interrelated approaches to international communication

1. idealistic-humanistic
2. proselytization
3. economic
4. the political

One of the most obvious manifestations of international communication are world news, when the media of one country cover news from abroad. But, apart from journalism, international communication also occurs in other areas (culture, technology, sciences) and the nature of the "information" that is circulated can be classified in a wide variety of categories, such as cultural (music, films, sports, TV shows from one country to another), scientific (research papers published abroad, scientific exchange or cooperation), and intelligence (diplomacy reports, international espionage, etc.).

Typically the study of international communication includes a deep attention to the circulation of news among different countries (and the resulting imbalances, from which came the concept of news flow), the power of media organizations (such as conglomerates and news agencies), issues such as cultural imperialism and media imperialism, and the political role that international cooperation can have in enhancing the media industry (and society as a whole) in a given region, such as proposed by development communication or communication for development.

Some renowned scholars in international communication include Wilbur Schramm, Ithiel de Sola Pool, Johan Galtung, Anthony Smith, Robert Stevenson, Jeremy Tunstall, Armand Mattelart, Oliver Boyd-Barrett, Ali Mohammadi, Annabelle Sreberny, Cees J. Hamelink, Daya Kishan Thussu and Chris Paterson. Journals in this field include International Communication Gazette, the Journal of International Communication and Language Problems and Language Planning.

== Development ==
The Second World War was a catalyst for international communication. Analytical tools for communications research are used to mobilize domestic public support for war, to understand enemy propaganda, and to develop psychological warfare techniques to influence the morale and opinions of allies and enemies. The Rockefeller Foundation convened and funded a communications seminar every month from 1939 to 1940 years at the New York headquarters. The initial purpose was to bring together leading scholars interested in communication to provide theoretical guidance for future communication studies, including Lasswell and Lazarsfeld. When the United States entered the war at the end of 1941, with the outbreak of the European economic crisis, communication research became an important factor in discussing government policies.

=== Communication technology development ===
Media development can be said to be independent media created by private interventions during the transition period through international intervention. Even before the emergence of technology, communication has been at the forefront of relationship building and business development. Today, newer advancements like texting and messaging apps have allowed for even more efficient international communication.

New Media: Internet and Wireless Communication.

==== International communication development ====
In the 1980s and 1990s, with the establishment and development of fiberoptic cables, satellites and the Internet, and the gradual proliferation are eroding space and time barriers and increasing speed, and reducing the cost of transmitting various information. This trend has pushed international communication to globalization.

== See also ==
- Intercultural communication
- Interlinguistics
- International student
- Mediated cross-border communication
- World news
- Language professional
- New world information and communication order
- MacBride report
- Global network
- Global digital divide
