= Global news flow =

Global news flow (also referred to as international news flow) is a field of study that deals with the news coverage of events in foreign countries. It describes and explains the flow of news from one country to another.

Studies on global news flow typically attempt to understand why certain countries are more newsworthy than others. Over the years, it has been found that the economic power of countries plays a particularly crucial role in their news prominence as well as the presence of international news agencies. Thus, the US is very prominent in news mentions around the world (18%), followed by China, Western European, and Middle Eastern countries (about 3-5% each).

The unequal representation of the world and the under-representation of developing countries have been a great concern at least since the 1950s, since they influence the way people perceive the world and the image of countries. This problem was later addressed in the MacBride report, and its set of recommendations for a New World Information and Communication Order. The unequal representation of the world has also been linked to the World System Theory, and the unequal economic structure of the world.

A 2014 study, examining 35 popular news websites in ten different languages over a two-year study period, found that "the United States is by far the most prominent country in the news sites that we studied from around the world, except for the French and Arabic ones" and the "network structure of news links clearly exhibits [the U.S.'s] key position as the centerpiece of a global system."

A 2015 study published in the journal Journalism, examining "validity and limits of the news flow theory," found that "Over-represented regional centers in Western Europe and Asia overshadow the under-represented regional peripheries in Eastern Europe and the Middle East" and that the United States and Africa "serve as a global center and a periphery respectively."

== See also ==
- Media imperialism
- World news
- International communication
- New World Information and Communication Order
- MacBride report
