= New World Information and Communication Order =

Term used for debates on media representation in the developing world

The New World Information and Communication Order (NWICO, also shortened to New World Information Order, NWIO or just, more generally, information order) is a term coined in a debate over media representations of the developing world in UNESCO in the late 1970s early 1980s. The NWICO movement was part of a broader effort to formally tackle global economic inequality that was viewed as a legacy of imperialism upon the global south.

The term was widely used by the MacBride Commission, a UNESCO panel chaired by Nobel Peace Prize laureate Seán MacBride, which was charged with creation of a set of recommendations to make global media representation more equitable. The MacBride Commission produced a report titled "Many Voices, One World", which outlined the main philosophical points of the New World Information Communication Order.

== History ==
The fundamental issues of imbalances in global communication had been discussed for some time. The American media scholar Wilbur Schramm noted in 1964 that the flow of news among nations is thin, that much attention is given to developed countries and little to less-developing ones, that important events are ignored and reality is distorted. From a more radical perspective, Herbert Schiller observed in 1969 that developing countries had little meaningful input into decisions about radio frequency allocations for satellites at a key meeting in Geneva in 1962. Schiller pointed out that many satellites had military applications. Intelsat which was set up for international co-operation in satellite communication, was also dominated by the United States.

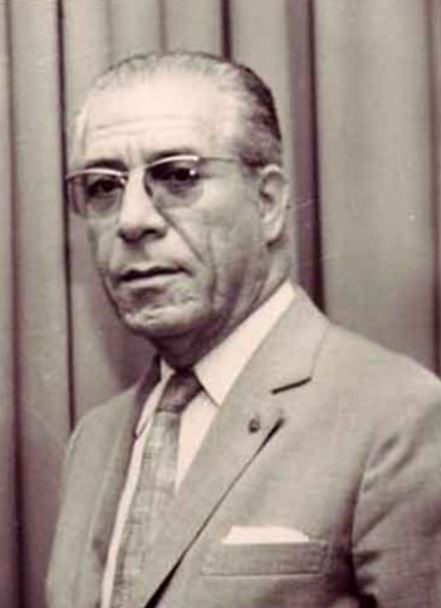
Hédi Amara Nouira, Prime Minister of Tunisia from 2 November 1970 til 23 April 1980

In 1970, at the 16th Congress of UNESCO, the need for a NWICO was clearly raised for the first time. In the 1970s these and other issues were taken up by the Non-Aligned Movement and debated within the United Nations and its agency responsible for communication, the United Nations Education, Scientific and Cultural Organization (UNESCO). In response to the New International Economic Order (NIEO) of 1974, the expression "New International Information Order" (NIIO) was established to protest the disadvantages countries in the global south faced in relation to information and communication. The Non-Aligned Movement alleged that news agencies in the Western world controlled 95 percent of worldwide information flows, namely Associated Press (AP), Agence France-Presse (AFP), United Press International (UPI), and Reuters. The term "new world information order" was coined by Hedi Nouira, the prime minister of Tunisia, who was the first to use it during a conference in 1974. From 1976 to 1978, the phrase New World Information and Communication Order was generally shortened to New World Information Order or the New International Information Order.

In 1976, for the first time, the slogan of establishing a "New World Information and Communication Order" was clearly proposed. At the start of this discussion, NWICO got associated with the UNESCO starting from the early 1970s.

Mass media concerns began with the meeting of non-aligned nations in Algiers, 1973; again in Tunis 1976, and later in 1976 at the New Delhi Ministerial Conference of Non-Aligned Nations. The "new order" plan was textually formulated by Tunisia's Information Minister Mustapha Masmoudi. Masmoudi submitted working paper No. 31 to the MacBride Commission. These proposals of 1978 were titled the 'Mass Media Declaration.' The MacBride Commission at the time was a 16-member body created by UNESCO to study communication issues.

The UNESCO work on the NWICO was immediately met with criticism from many areas, mainly from Western countries. An interim report released in 1979 by UNESCO was targeted by the American Newspaper Publishers Association and the American Society of Newspaper Editors. While these organizations took issue with some of the early proposals including right of reply and press councils, they also were troubled by the phrase "New World Information and Communication Order", seeing it as a dog-whistle for the use of government propaganda in the guise of information flow balance. The criticism of UNESCO was sometimes overdrawn, as when presstime (the journal of the American Newspapers Publishers Association) carried an article suggesting that a study on U.S.-UNESCO relations commissioned by UNESCO was "a cheap shot against the press" and that "it will add no luster to UNESCO's image," before the book even coming into existence.

In 1980 the MacBride Report was published. The report stated that the right to inform and be informed was critical to modern societies, and that information was a key resource. The report than proposed five main ideas of action to progress these goals

1. Include communication as a fundamental right.
2. Reduce imbalances in the news structure.
3. Strengthen a global strategy for communication while respecting cultural identities and individual rights.
4. Promote the creation of national communication policies to be coherent and lasting in the processes of development.
5. Explore how the NWICO could be used to benefit a New International Economic Order (NIEO).

Following the release of the report director-general Amadou Mahtar M'Bow was reelected as the head of UNESCO, and those in favor of the NWICO movement found the report giving them strength. UNESCO received a thirty four percent increase in funding, and the United States agreed in principle to creating a new international body for communication in developing countries "within the framework of UNESCO". The report itself was controversial, as many viewed it as lending strength to the Communist and nonaligned blocs. M'Bow backed a compromise resolution that eliminated the more radical proposals of the report, however hard liners resisted these changes. Likewise, the United States warned that they would not provide funds or technical assistance if UNESCO appeared to desire government control of media.

In December 1980 the United Nations formally endorsed the MacBride Report by saying that nations should "take into account" the report in framing of communications policy. The resolution also invited members to promote "the widespread circulation and study" of the report. While not a binding resolution, this move was met with immediate criticism from the British government, saying they did not regard the report as definitive.

In 1983, the 22nd edition of UNESCO established the medium-term plan for the establishment of NWICO from 1985 to 1989. The struggle to establish a new world information order won broad support within the United Nations. Among those involved in the movement were the Latin American Institute for the Study of Transnationals (ILET). One of its co-founders, Juan Somavia was a member of the MacBride Commission. Another important voice was Mustapha Masmoudi, the Information Minister for Tunisia. In a Canadian radio program in 1983, Tom McPhail describes how the issues were pressed within UNESCO in the mid-1970s when the United States withheld funding to punish the organization for excluding Israel from a regional group of UNESCO. Some OPEC countries and a few socialist countries made up the amount of money and were able to get senior positions within UNESCO. NWICO issues were then advanced at an important meeting in 1976 held in Costa Rica.

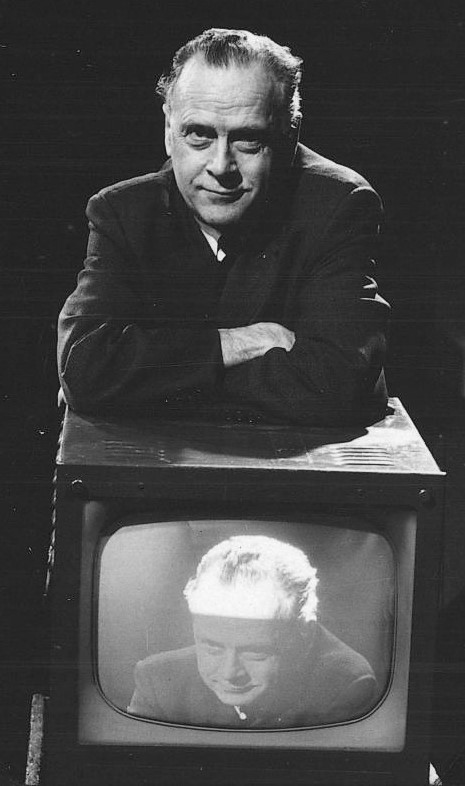
Marshall McLuhan leaning on television set on which his image appears, 1967

The only woman member of the commission was Betty Zimmerman, representing Canada because of the illness of Marshall McLuhan, who died in 1980. The movement was kept alive through the 1980s by meetings of the MacBride Round Table on Communication, even though by then the leadership of UNESCO distanced itself from its ideas.

== NWICO failure ==
When NWICO appeared to have failed, UNESCO adopted a plan for the medium term, defined as 1990 til 1995, under the title "Communication at the service of humanity" (La communication au service de l'humanité). The plan foresaw the free circulation of information.

The UNESCO Convention on the Protection and Promotion of the Diversity of Cultural Expressions of 2005 puts into effect some of the goals of NWICO, especially with regard to the unbalanced global flow of mass media. However, this convention was not supported by the United States, and it does not appear to be as robust as World Trade Organization agreements that support global trade in mass media and information.

== Issues ==
A wide range of issues were raised as part of NWICO discussions. Some of these involved long-standing issues of media coverage of the developing world and unbalanced flows of media influence. But other issues involved new technologies with important military and commercial uses. The developing world was likely to be marginalized by satellite and computer technologies. The issues included:

- News reporting on the developing world that reflects the priorities of news agencies in London, Paris and New York. Reporting of natural disasters and military coups rather than the fundamental realities. At the time four major news agencies controlled over 80% of global news flow.
- The Universal Declaration of Human Rights states "everyone has the right ... to seek, receive and impart information and ideas through any media and regardless of frontiers". This was used by supporters to claim the NWICO discussions were, at their core, based upon human rights.
- An unbalanced flow of mass media from the developed world (especially the United States) to the underdeveloped countries. Everyone watches American movies and television shows.
- Advertising agencies in the developed world have indirect but significant effects on mass media in the developing countries. Some observers also judged the messages of these ads to be inappropriate for the Third World.
- An unfair division of the radio spectrum. A small number of developed countries controlled almost 90% of the radio spectrum. Much of this was for military use.
- There were similar concerns about the allocation of the geostationary orbit (parking spots in space) for satellites. At the time only a small number of developed countries had satellites and it was not possible for developing countries to be allocated a space that they might need ten years later. This might mean eventually getting a space that was more difficult and more expensive to operate.
- Satellite broadcasting of television signals into Third World countries without prior permission was widely perceived as a threat to national sovereignty. The UN voted in the early 1970s against such broadcasts.
- Use of satellites to collect information on crops and natural resources in the Third World at a time when most developing countries lacked the capacity to analyze this data.
- At the time most mainframe computers were located in the United States and there were concerns about the location of databases (such as airline reservations) and the difficulty of developing countries catching up with the US lead in computers.
- The protection of journalists from violence was raised as an issue for discussion. For example, journalists were targeted by various military dictatorships in Latin America in the 1970s. As part of NWICO debates there were suggestions for study on how to protect journalists and even to discipline journalists who broke "generally recognized ethical standards". However, the MacBride Commission specifically came out against the idea of licensing journalists.

== American responses ==
The United States government was hostile to NWICO. According to some analysts, the United States saw these issues simply as barriers to the free flow of communication and to the interests of American media corporations. It disagreed with the MacBride report at points where it questioned the role of the private sector in communications. It viewed the NWICO as dangerous to freedom of the press by ultimately putting an organization run by governments at the head of controlling global media, potentially allowing for censorship on a large scale.

While the Carter administration had been responsive to the goals of UNESCO, the Reagan administration took on a different approach. The work of UNESCO was perceived by this administration to limit both individual and press freedoms. Additionally, anti-communist cold war sentiments were gaining increased traction in the United States. The US eventually withdrew its membership in UNESCO at the end of 1984. The matter was complicated by debates within UNESCO about Israel's archaeological work in the city of Jerusalem, and about the Apartheid regime in South Africa. The United States rejoined in 2003.

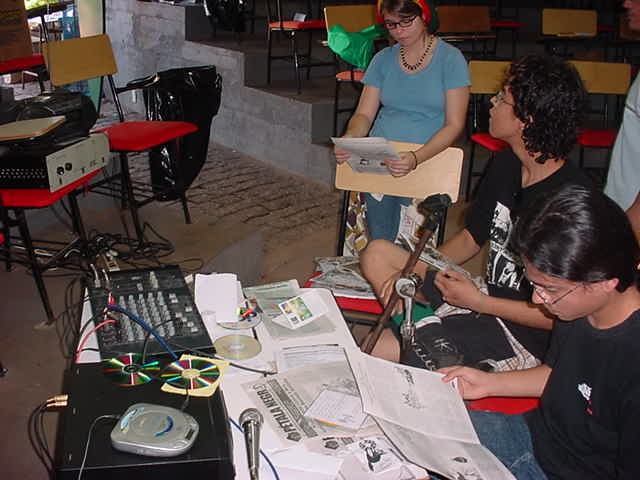
Indymedia collective at Mato Grosso Federal University in Cuiabá, Brazil hosting a free radio broadcast in 2004.

The Independent Media Center (IMC) was established in Seattle, USA, on November 24 of 1999 as a cluster of independent news media and websites. IMC is a new media collective hosted by grassroots organizations generally supportive of the intent of NWICO (while pointing out 1st amendment concerns along the way). Founded by a grass-roots synthesis of anti-Neoliberalists and activists, IMC was considered to be a pioneering effort to gain freedom of the press, and theoretically part of a more democratic "new world information order".

== Developments ==
The debate on the NWICO that started in the 1970s reflected criticism about non-equitable access to information and media imperialism. The NWICO saw the United Kingdom and the United States back out of UNESCO until 1997 for the UK and 2003 for the US. In 1990–2000, a switch occurred globally, carried by the Internet that contributed to bring more equity to the available content. This was supported by the extension of media powers to developing countries such as Mexico, Korea, Kenya and Nigeria; by the adoption of protectionist measures in regards to the free market by western countries like Canada and France; and with the rise of satellite broadcasting as a transnational means for non-western countries. Still, evidence suggests global media has a strong bias towards the global north. Studies estimate around eighty percent of international news travels through Reuters, Agence France-Press, United Press International, and the Associated Press. Only around twenty percent of this news focuses on developing countries. In the decades following the NWICO debates little changed in this regard as a study on stories relating to Africa in the New York Times and The Washington Post showed in 2000. In this study of 89 articles, all lacked sufficient context linking the West to Africa, and seventy-five of them were negative in content.

=== World Press Freedom Day ===
The 1991 Windhoek Declaration for the Development of a Free, Independent and Pluralistic Press is a statement of press freedom principles by African newspaper journalists. African diplomats in UNESCO, the United Nations Economic and Social Council (ECOSOC), and the UN General Assembly commitment were crucial to the success of the Windhoek process.

2023 Press Freedom Index Good situation Satisfactory situation Noticeable problems Difficult situation Very serious situation Not classified / No data

UNESCO endorsed the Windhoek Declaration and United Nations General Assembly recognized the 3 May, date of the Declaration, as "World Press Freedom Day". The Windhoek Declaration has had other significant impacts in the media field. UNESCO adopted the Windhoek framework concerning media development, characterizing it by freedom, pluralism and independence.

The Windhoek Declaration is implemented through the Media Development Indicators (MDIs) framework developed by the International Programme for the Development of Communication Intergovernmental Council in 2006. Resonating with the NWICO, the MDIs help assessing the priority areas for media development that are the promotion of freedom of expression and media pluralism, the development of community media and of human resources.

=== International Programme for the Development of Communication (IPDC) ===
As a result of the "Many Voices, One World" 1980 report UNESCO's General Conference launched the International Programme for the Development of Communication (IPDC) the same year in Belgrade. The Programme was adopted by 39 Member States and aimed at strengthening the development of mass media in developing countries. Its mandate since 2003 is "... to contribute to sustainable development, democracy and good governance by fostering universal access to and distribution of information and knowledge by strengthening the capacities of the developing countries and countries in transition in the field of electronic media and the printed press."

=== World Summit on the Information Society (WSIS) ===
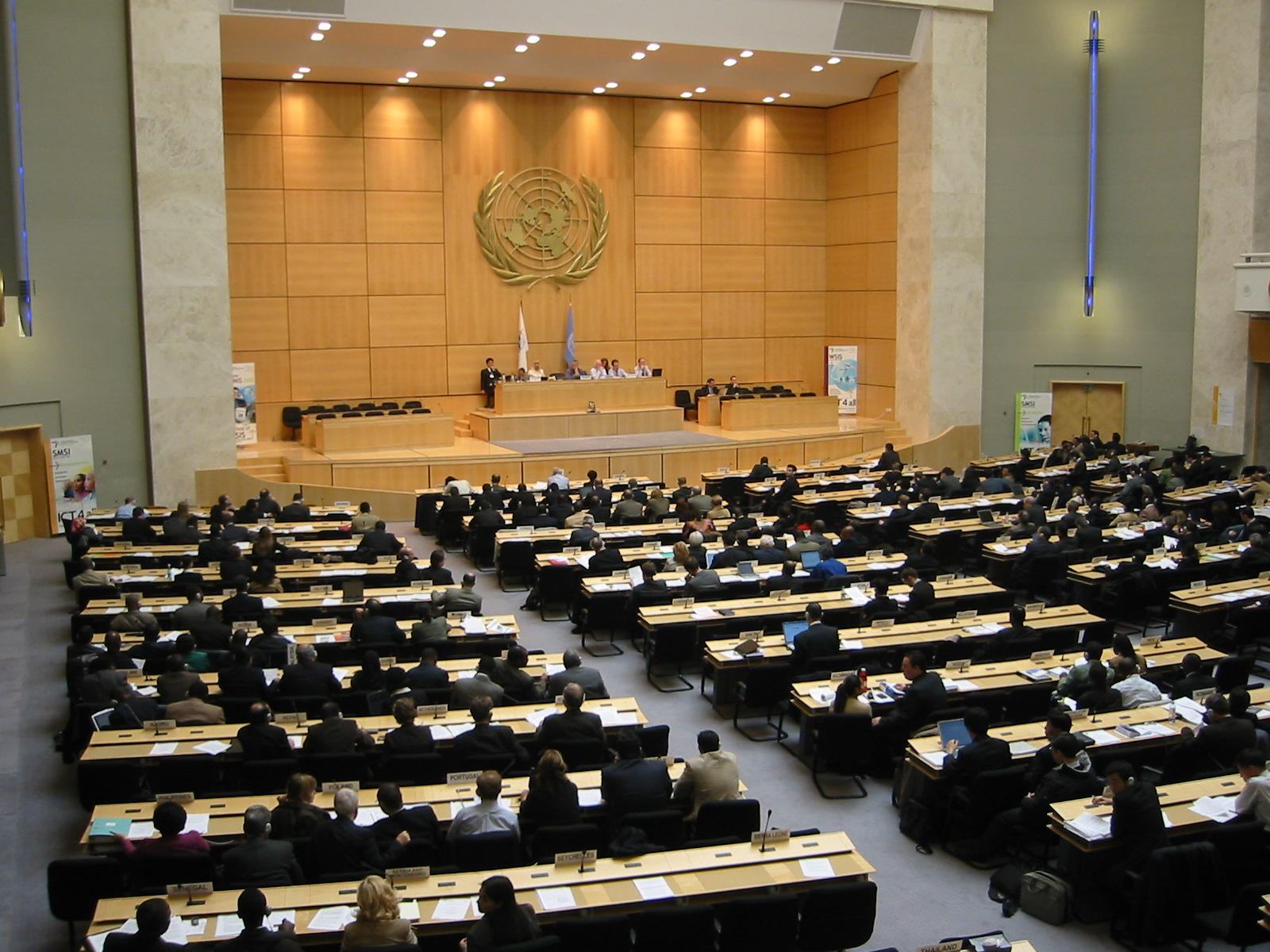
Second preliminary session of the World Summit Information Society, plenary meeting, 18–25 February 2005, UNO building, Geneva, Switzerland.

In December of 2003 in Geneva and November of 2005, two phases of the UN World Summit on the Information Society (WSIS) were held. These gatherings were done to develop a "common vision of the information society" and to overcome the digital divide within the United Nations Millennial Development Goals. This process involved both governmental actors as well as non-governmental organizations and sought to solve many of the issues proposed during the NWICO debate. Critics have noted that WSIS was too narrow minded a process and focused exclusively on an information technology approach.

=== Safety of journalists ===
Threats on journalists are one of the major issues blocking media development. Since 2008, UNESCO Member States submit information on the status of the judicial inquiries conducted on each of the journalists killings condemned by the Organization. This information is included in a public report submitted every two years to the IPDC Council by the Director-General and is basis to the Programme's follow-up to killings of journalists.

=== Technological ===
Technological developments have direct effects on access to information and on privacy. Access to information is the ability for an individual to seek, receive and impart information effectively. According to Guy Berger, "access to digital means of communication, even within the limits established by platform owners, is unprecedented". Since the NWICO debate, many of the desired developments have come about through access to the internet and mobile phones. Many are now able to seek as well as impart information to the public. The one way information flow from Global North to South has been corrected partially due to this flow of information. The biggest barrier is now lack of access, and as of 2013 only one third of the population has such access (with some of the poorest regions having less than 10% access).

There has been a significant increase in access to the Internet in recent years, which reached just over three billion users in 2014, amounting to about 42 per cent of the world's population. Nevertheless, issues remain such as the digital divide, the gender divide and the security argument. A digital divide is an economic and social inequality with regard to access to, use of, or impact of information and communications technology (ICT).

Social barriers such as literacy and lack of digital empowerment have created stark inequalities between men and women in navigating the tools used for access to information. Also, with the evolution of the digital age, freedom of speech and its corollaries, including freedom of information, and access to information, become more controversial. As new means of communication arise, so too do new restrictions including government control or commercial methods that succeed in turning personal information into a danger.

The increasing access to and reliance on digital media to receive and produce information have increased the possibilities for States and private sector companies to track individuals' behaviors, opinions and networks. States have increasingly adopted laws and policies to legalize monitoring of communication, justifying these practices with the need to defend their own citizens and national interests. In parts of Europe, new anti-terrorism laws have enabled a greater degree of government surveillance and an increase in the ability of intelligence authorities to access citizens' data. While legality is a precondition for legitimate limitations of human rights, the issue is also whether a given law is aligned to other criteria for justification such as necessity, proportionality, and legitimate purpose.

== See also ==
- Communication for Development
- Community film
- Development communication
- Freedom of speech
- Inter Press Service
- International communication
- International Programme for the Development of Communication
- NAM News Network
- New International Economic Order
- Non-Aligned News Agencies Pool
- Global news flow
