= Windhoek Declaration =

Statement of press freedom principles by African newspaper journalists in 1991

The Windhoek Declaration for the Development of a Free, Independent and Pluralistic Press, the Windhoek Declaration for short, is a statement of press freedom principles issued by African newspaper journalists in 1991. The declaration was produced at a UNESCO seminar, "Promoting an Independent and Pluralistic African Press," held in Windhoek, the capital of Namibia, from 29 April to 3 May 1991. The declaration was inscribed in UNESCO's Memory of the World International Register in 2025.

The date of the declaration's adoption, May 3, has subsequently been declared as World Press Freedom Day. The document has been viewed as widely influential, as the first in a series of such declarations around the world, and as a crucial affirmation of the international community's commitment to freedom of the press. Subsequently, several similar documents were drafted in other parts of the developing world: The Alma-Ata Declaration for central Asia, Sanaa Declaration for the Middle East, and the Santiago Declaration for Latin America and the Caribbean. At the tenth anniversary of the Windhoek Declaration, however, the United Nations jubilee statement noted the fragility of press freedom in the face of political violence or authoritarianism.

== A new communication strategy ==
Since it was formally approved by the UNESCO Member States during the 28th Session of the General Conference (November 1995), the Windhoek Declaration has become a major reference in the United Nations system. It is part of the new communication strategy decided by UNESCO's General Conference during its 25th Session in November 1989. This new strategy de facto distanced itself from the New World Information and Communication Order (NWICO) which was subject to controversies within the Organization in the 1980s. These controversies have divided UNESCO and caused the United States and the United Kingdom to withdraw from the Organisation (in 1984 and 1985). The NWICO was also subject to oppositions from several professional media organizations, which saw in the New Order a means allowing states to control the media with the justification, among others, to encourage wider and better balanced dissemination of information between North and South.

The 1989 New Communication Strategy stresses that this can only be reached "without any obstacle to freedom of expression" in accordance with the fundamental purpose of UNESCO to promote the "free flow of ideas by word and image".

== Genesis of the Windhoek seminar ==
The Windhoek seminar was a direct follow-up to the East-West Roundtable that the Director General, Federico Mayor had rapidly set up in February 1990, a few weeks after the fall of the Berlin Wall, in order to address one of the numerous challenges generated by the end of the Cold War, that is the democratization of the media landscape in Central and Oriental European countries. Sixty independent journalists from the Soviet Bloc but also journalists from Europe and North America had participated in the Roundtable. Unlike the Windhoek seminar, the East-West Roundtable hadn't adopted a final text. Its main purpose was to offer a platform for free expression to the participants whose many had just come out from underground. Several representatives of UNESCO Member States also attended the Roundtable as observers, among them some African diplomats who had asked the Director General that a similar conference be held on their continent. The Windhoek seminar was organized in response to their request.

== The Windhoek process ==
At the 26th session of the General Conference (November 1991), the Member States of UNESCO expressed their deep satisfaction with the outcome of the Windhoek seminar and invited the Director-General "to extend to other regions of the world the action taken so far in Africa and Europe to encourage press freedom and to promote the independence and pluralism of the media; (b) to celebrate the anniversary of the Windhoek Declaration adopted on 3 May 1991; (c) to transmit to the United Nations General Assembly the wish expressed by the Member States of UNESCO to have 3 May declared ‘International Press Freedom Day".

The implementation of resolution 26C/4.3 initiated a process in which all initiatives were related to each other. Thus, the Windhoek Declaration had a catalytic function in the democratization movement that was transforming the international media landscape of the 1990s. It was in this framework that UNESCO and the United Nations, with the support of professional media organizations, have jointly-organized four regional seminars similar to the Windhoek seminar: the first for the Asian media (Alma Ata, Kazakhstan; October 1992), the second for countries from Latin America and the Caribbean (Santiago, Chile; May 1994), the third for Arab countries (Sanaa, Yemen; January 1996) and the last one for Europe and North America (Sofia, Bulgaria; September 1997). Each seminar ended with the adoption of a declaration in which participants highlighted "their full support and entire adhesion to the fundamental principles of the Windhoek Declaration, recognizing its crucial importance for the promotion of free, independent and pluralistic media, in written and broadcast press, worldwide". UNESCO's General Conference endorsed the five declarations of Windhoek, Alma Ata, Santiago, Sanaa and Sofia at its 28th session for the first three (1995) and its 29th for the last two (1997). It is unusual for the Member States of an international organization to adopt texts coming from the civil society without making any changes, more so that these declarations are very critical of the politics and practices of certain States towards medias (without making specific reference to any of them).

In addition to the adoption of the five declarations by UNESCO's Member States, the "Windhoek process" has produced other significant results in the media field:

- In February 1992, UNESCO's International Programme for the Development of Communication (IPDC) has changed its operating rules to take into account the Windhoek Declaration's recommendations. Since then, projects submitted by the private sector have been able to benefit from the IPDC's financial support, on the same terms as those from the public sector. Editorial independence is a common criterion.
- In 1992, UNESCO has provided its support to the establishment of an international alert network based in Toronto, the International Freedom of Expression Exchange (IFEX) as well as to the creation of the Media Institute of Southern Africa (MISA), one of whose mission is to support the implementation of the Windhoek Declaration's recommendations.
- In December 1993, the United Nations General Assembly proclaimed the 3d of May World Press Freedom Day, thus embodying the proposal made by the Windhoek seminar participants and taken over by UNESCO's General Conference.
- On the occasion of the 1996 3 May celebration, UNESCO's Director-General announced the creation of the UNESCO/Guillermo Cano World Press Freedom Prize which was a proposal made by the participants to the 1993 Santiago seminar. This prize is destined to distinguish a person, organization or institution which has contributed noticeably to the defense and/or promotion of press freedom in the world. It was awarded for the first time in 1997 and, since then, awarded every year by the Director-General in the occasion of World Press Freedom Day. The prizewinner is chosen by an independent panel composed of journalists from all the regions of the world and from all types of media, including digital media.

== The symbolic value of the Windhoek Declaration for Africans ==
The personal commitment of a few African diplomats in Paris (UNESCO), Geneva (ECOSOC) and New York (UN General Assembly) has been crucial to the success of the Windhoek process. They were those who put forward and defended in these intergovernmental fora the suggestion made at Windhoek by journalists to establish World Press Freedom Day annually celebrated on May 3. They were also those who sponsored a draft resolution to the UNESCO General Conference intended to endorse the Windhoek Declaration. This African initiative has opened the path to the four other Declarations of Alma Ata, Santiago, Sanaa and Sofia to be adopted without objection. For the Ambassador of Niger Lambert Messan, president in 1995 of the UNESCO African Group, "the Windhoek Declaration is the African contribution to the edifice of human rights".
