= Sustainable Development Goal 16 =

United Nations sustainable development goal

- Mission statement: "Promote peaceful and inclusive societies for sustainable development, provide access to justice for all and build effective, accountable and inclusive institutions at all levels"
- Commercial?: No
- Type of project: Non-Profit
- Location: Global
- Founder: United Nations
- Established: 2015
- Website: sdgs.un.org

Sustainable Development Goal 16 (SDG 16 or Global Goal 16) is one of the 17 Sustainable Development Goals established by the United Nations in 2015, the official wording is: "Promote peaceful and inclusive societies for sustainable development, provide access to justice for all and build effective, accountable and inclusive institutions at all levels". The Goal has 12 targets and 23 indicators.

SDG 16 has ten outcome targets: Reduce violence; protect children from abuse, exploitation, trafficking and violence; promote the rule of law and ensure equal access to justice; combat organized crime and illicit financial and arms flows, substantially reduce corruption and bribery; develop effective, accountable and transparent institutions; ensure responsive, inclusive and representative decision-making; strengthen the participation in global governance; provide universal legal identity; ensure public access to information and protect fundamental freedoms. There are also two means of implementation targets: Strengthen national institutions to prevent violence and combat crime and terrorism; promote and enforce non-discriminatory laws and policies.

== Background ==
The Sustainable Development Goals are a collection of 17 global goals set by the United Nations. The goals are interrelated though each has its own targets to achieve. The SDGs cover a broad range of social and economic development issues.

SDG 16 addresses the need to promote peace and inclusive institutions. Areas of improvement include for example: reducing lethal violence, reducing civilian deaths in conflicts, and eliminating human trafficking.

Several of the SDGs and targets focus on marginalized people and "seek to increase inclusiveness and to foster justice". SDG 16 has a strong focus on inclusive societies and institutions. At the global level, SDG 16 could have steering effects on inclusiveness in global governance, in particular for the least developed countries. However, a meta analysis in 2022 has shown that "rhetoric and action do not match when it comes to the impacts of the Sustainable Development Goals on inclusiveness within and between countries".

== Targets, Indicators and progress ==
SDG 16 has twelve targets and twenty-four indicators. Three of the targets specify their agenda by the year 2030. Below is the list of all the targets with a short version and a long version of the titles. No data is available yet for the following indicators: 16.4.1, 16.4.2, 16.6.2, 16.7.1, 16.7.2, 16.b.1. For all the other indicators, data and world maps are available to visualize progress.

=== Target 16.1: Reduce violence everywhere ===
Long title: "Significantly reduce all forms of violence and related death rates everywhere."

This target has four indicators:

- Indicator 16.1.1 Number of victims of intentional homicide per 100,000 population, by age.
- Indicator 16.1.2 Conflict-related deaths per 100,000 population, by age and cause.
- Indicator 16.1.3 Proportion of population subjected to (a) physical violence, (b) psychological violence and (c) sexual violence in the previous 12 months.
- Indicator 16.1.4 Proportion of population that feel safe walking alone around the area they live.

Honor based violence (HBV) is classified as not only murder or violence, but rather a heroic attainment of religious beliefs, typically committed by a male family member. The United Nations estimates that around 5,000 women are killed annually in relation to HBV. However, the actual number is several times higher due to weak administration of these crimes. Authorities are reluctant to report statistics that could potentially affect their international reputation or are bribed in order to protect the family's reputation. Target 16.5 indicates instills the concept of bribery further, and Target 16.2 portrays the lack of crime reported.

Where conflict strikes, men are more likely to die on battlefields, but women will be targeted for sexual violence, exploitation and other violation.

UNICEF, as well as indicator 16.1.3, classifies violence into three categories: physical, psychological, and sexual. Save the Children, a non-governmental organization aimed to help vulnerable adolescents in Bolivia who fit at least one classification of violence through modules as follows:

- Module 1- Self-esteem, personal empowerment, and leadership
- Module 2- Sexual and reproductive health
- Module 3- Entrepreneurial skills and economic empowerment
- Module 4- Basic competences; math and literacy

The program was found to have had a positive effect for success for females, with an improvement in bargaining power within the household and reduction in income-related stress. Additionally, this program may be a factor that led to the decrease in violence against girls in Bolivia.

The UNODC reports that in 2017 alone, around 464,000 people were victims of intentional homicide and homicide rates were 6.1 per 100,000. Two thirds of global homicides occur in Latin America and the Caribbeans or sub-Saharan Africa. Poverty, economic inequality, proximity to the United States’ readily accessible firearm supply, and high youth unemployment are some of the major reasons behind the high homicide rates in Latin America. The UNODC found that, homicides are four times morel likely to occur in regions with high economic disparity than those that have economic equity, which helps to explain the high homicide rates in some Latin American regions. Although homicide rates have been seeing a reduction the past several years, the progress on SDG 16 has been reversing. If current global trends continue, it is estimated that all forms of violence will increase by 10-46 percent by 2030.

=== Target 16.2: Protect children from abuse, exploitation, trafficking and violence ===
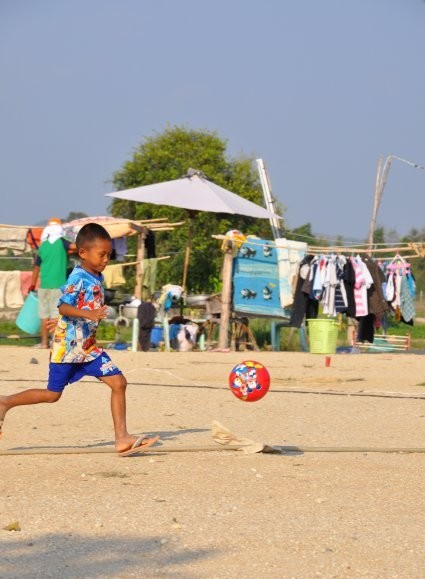
Child Protection and Development Center

Long title: "End abuse, exploitation, trafficking and all forms of violence against and torture of children."

This target has three indicators:

- Indicator 16.2.1: Proportion of children aged 1–17 years who experienced any physical punishment and/or psychological aggression by caregivers in the past month.
- Indicator 16.2.2: Number of victims of human trafficking per 100,000 population, by sex, age and form of exploitation.
- Indicator 16.2.3: Proportion of young women and men aged 18–29 years who experienced sexual violence by age 18.

One target is to see the end to sex trafficking, forced labor, and all forms of violence against and torture of children. It is difficult to monitor this target though because there is insufficient data on some types of crime, for example violent punishment of children. Violence against children by their caregivers is widespread. The global COVID-19 pandemic has magnified the challenges of child protection and mental health services. With this occurring in the world currently, no country is on track to eliminate all forms of violence and to promote mental health and well-being as the 2030 Agenda for Sustainable Development pledges.

In 2017, the UN reported some progress on detecting victims of trafficking. Sexual exploitation numbers have declined, but forced labor has increased.

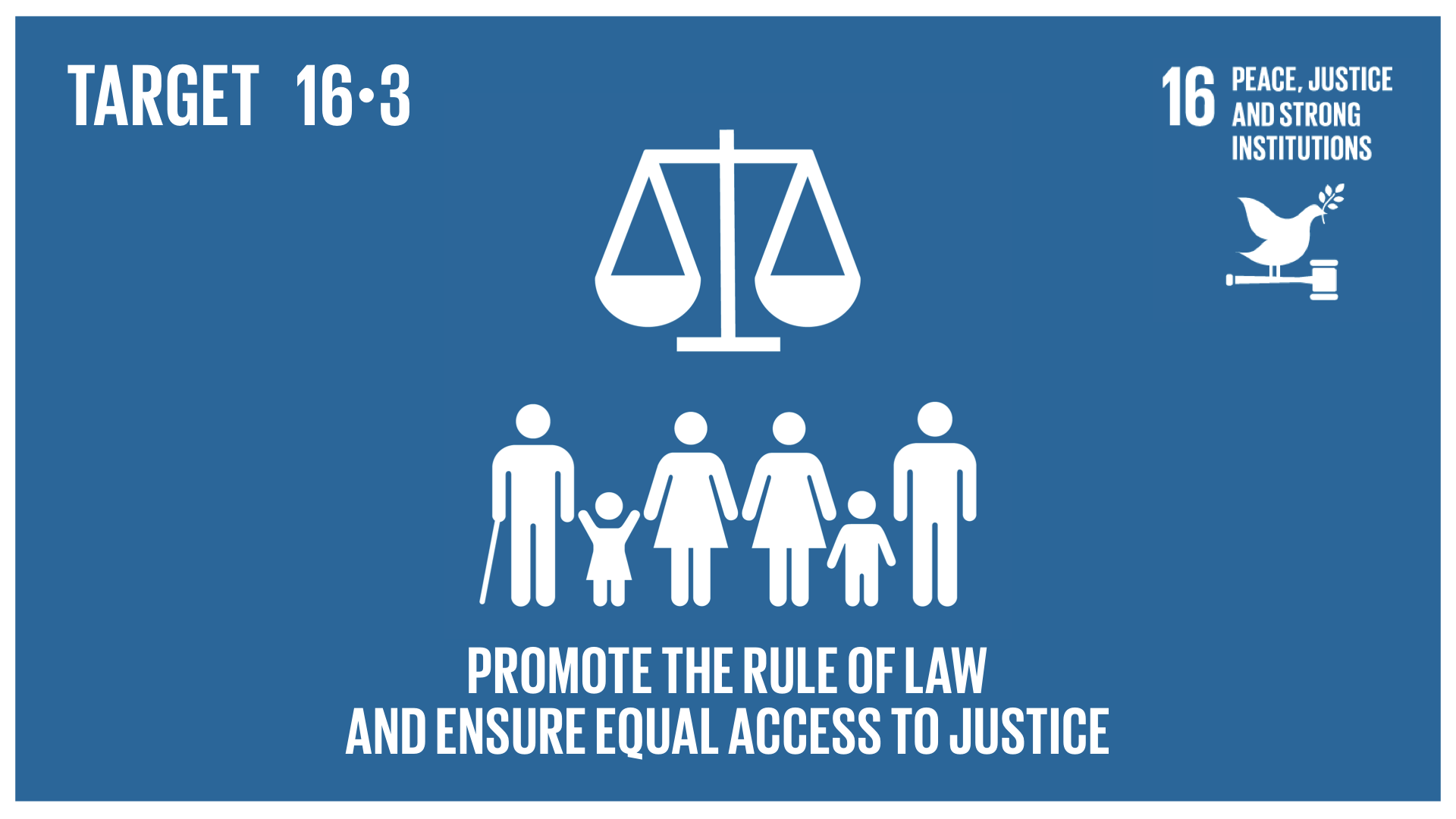
SDG Target 16.3 | Promote the rule of law at the national and international levels and ensure equal access to justice for all

=== Target 16.3: Equal access to justice ===
The full text of Target 16.3 is: "Promote the rule of law at the national and international levels and ensure equal access to justice for all."

This target has three indicators:

- Indicator 16.3.1: Proportion of victims of violence in the previous 12 months who reported their victimization to competent authorities or other officially recognized conflict resolution mechanisms.
- Indicator 16.3.2: Unsentenced detainees as a proportion of overall prison population.
- Indicator 16.3.3: Proportion of the population who have experienced a dispute in the past two years and who accessed a formal or informal dispute resolution mechanism, by type of mechanism.

A world map for indicator 16.3.2 - unsentenced detainees as a proportion of overall prison population

Regarding indicator 16.3.2, a progress report from 2019 concludes that of the 149 countries with available data, 31 countries had "a rate lower than 15 per cent" and 62 had "a rate higher than 35 per cent." Asia and Oceania countries experienced high increases in rates during the years 2016–2018.

Indicator 16.3.3 was added to the official indicator framework in 2020, when it was approved by the United Nations Statistical Commission. It measures the proportion of the population who have experienced a dispute in the past two years and who accessed a formal or informal dispute resolution mechanism, by type of mechanism.

=== Target 16.4: Combat organized crime and illicit financial and arms flows ===
The full text of Target 16.4: "By 2030, significantly reduce illicit financial and arms flows, strengthen the recovery and return of stolen assets and combat all forms of organized crime."

The target has two indicators:

- Indicator 16.4.1: Total value of inward and outward illicit financial flows (in current United States dollars).
- Indicator 16.4.2: Proportion of seized, found or surrendered arms whose illicit origin or context has been traced or established by a competent authority in line with international instruments.

=== Target 16.5: Substantially reduce corruption and bribery ===
The full text of Target 16.5: "Substantially reduce corruption and bribery in all their forms."

The target has two indicators:

- Indicator 16.5.1: Proportion of persons who had at least one contact with a public official and who paid a bribe to a public official, or were asked for a bribe by those public officials, during the previous 12 months.
- Indicator 16.5.2: Proportion of businesses that had at least one contact with a public official and that paid a bribe to a public official, or were asked for a bribe by those public officials during the previous 12 months.

Based on available data from 38 countries collected in years 2010-2020, bribery when accessing public services was least present (at an average rate of 3.7 per cent) in high-income countries and most present (at an average of 22.3 per cent) in lower-income countries.

=== Target 16.6: Develop effective, accountable and transparent institutions ===
The full text of Target 16.6: "Develop effective, accountable and transparent institutions at all levels."

The target has two indicators:

- Indicator 16.6.1: Primary government expenditures as a proportion of original approved budget, by sector (or by budget codes or similar).
- Indicator 16.6.2: Proportion of population satisfied with their last experience of public services.

This is the end.

=== Target 16.7: Ensure responsive, inclusive and representative decision-making ===
The full text of Target 16.7: "Ensure responsive, inclusive, participatory and representative decision-making at all levels."

The target has two indicators:

- Indicator 16.7.1: Proportions of positions in national and local institutions, including (a) the legislatures; (b) the public service; and (c) the judiciary, compared to national distributions, by sex, age, persons with disabilities and population groups.
- Indicator 16.7.2: Proportion of population who believe decision-making is inclusive and responsive, by sex, age, disability and population group.

=== Target 16.8: Strengthen the participation in global governance ===
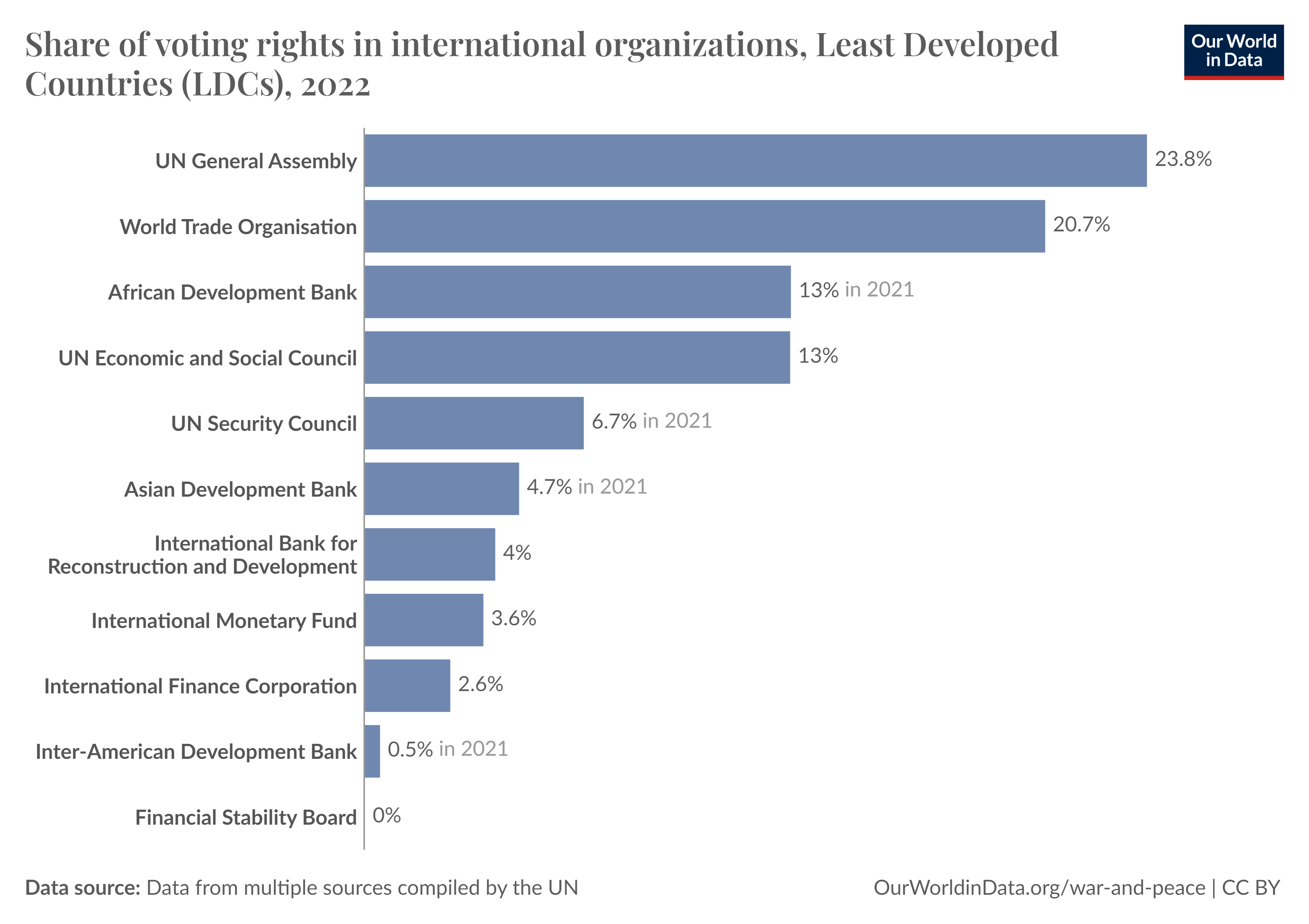
Share of voting rights in international organizations, for Least Developed Countries (LDCs), as of 2022

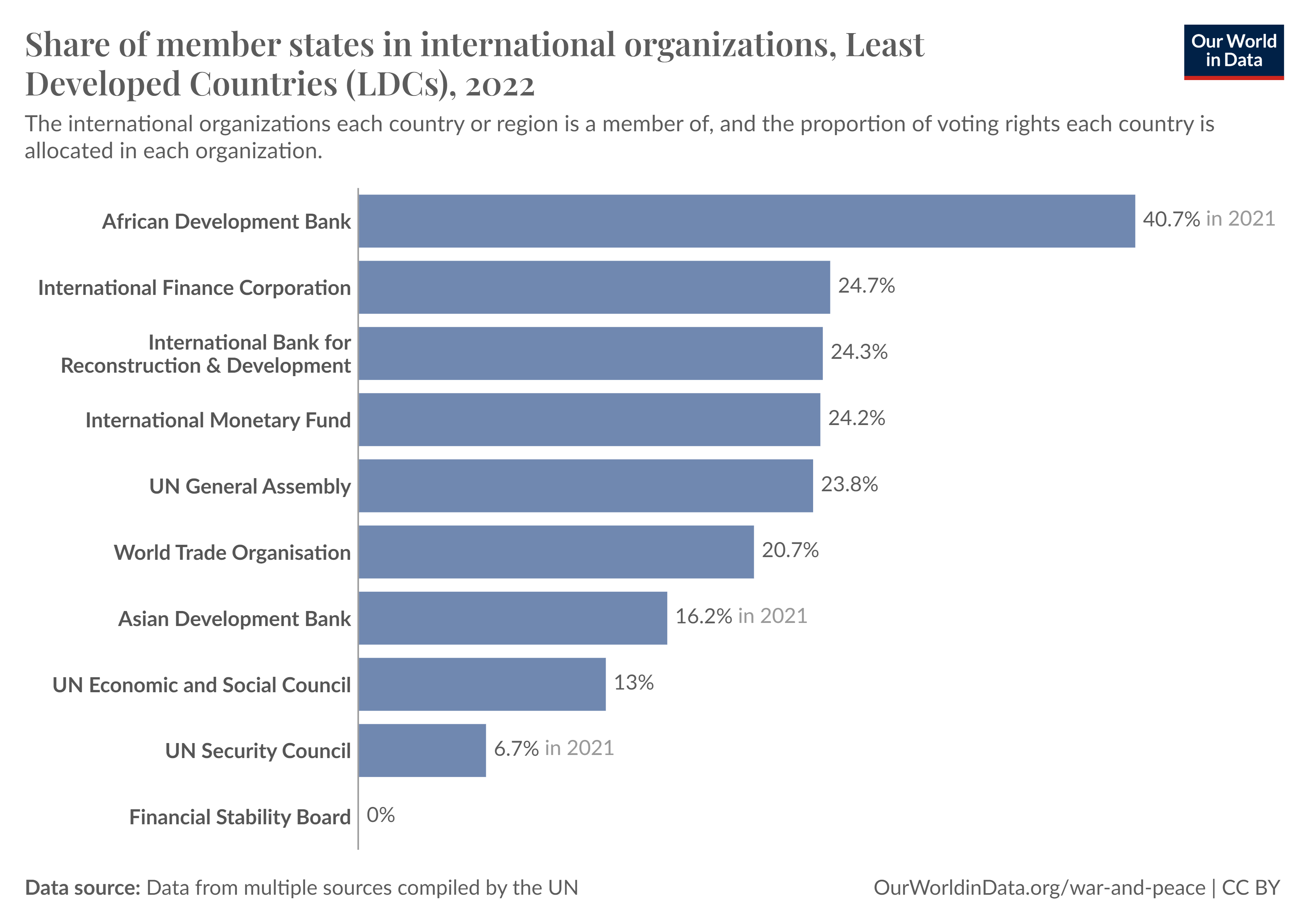
Share of member states in international organizations, for Least Developed Countries (LDCs), as of 2022

The full text of Target 16.8: "Broaden and strengthen the participation of developing countries in the institutions of global governance." The target has a single indicator.

Indicator 16.8.1 is the "Proportion of members and voting rights of developing countries in international organizations".

=== Target 16.9: Provide universal legal identity ===
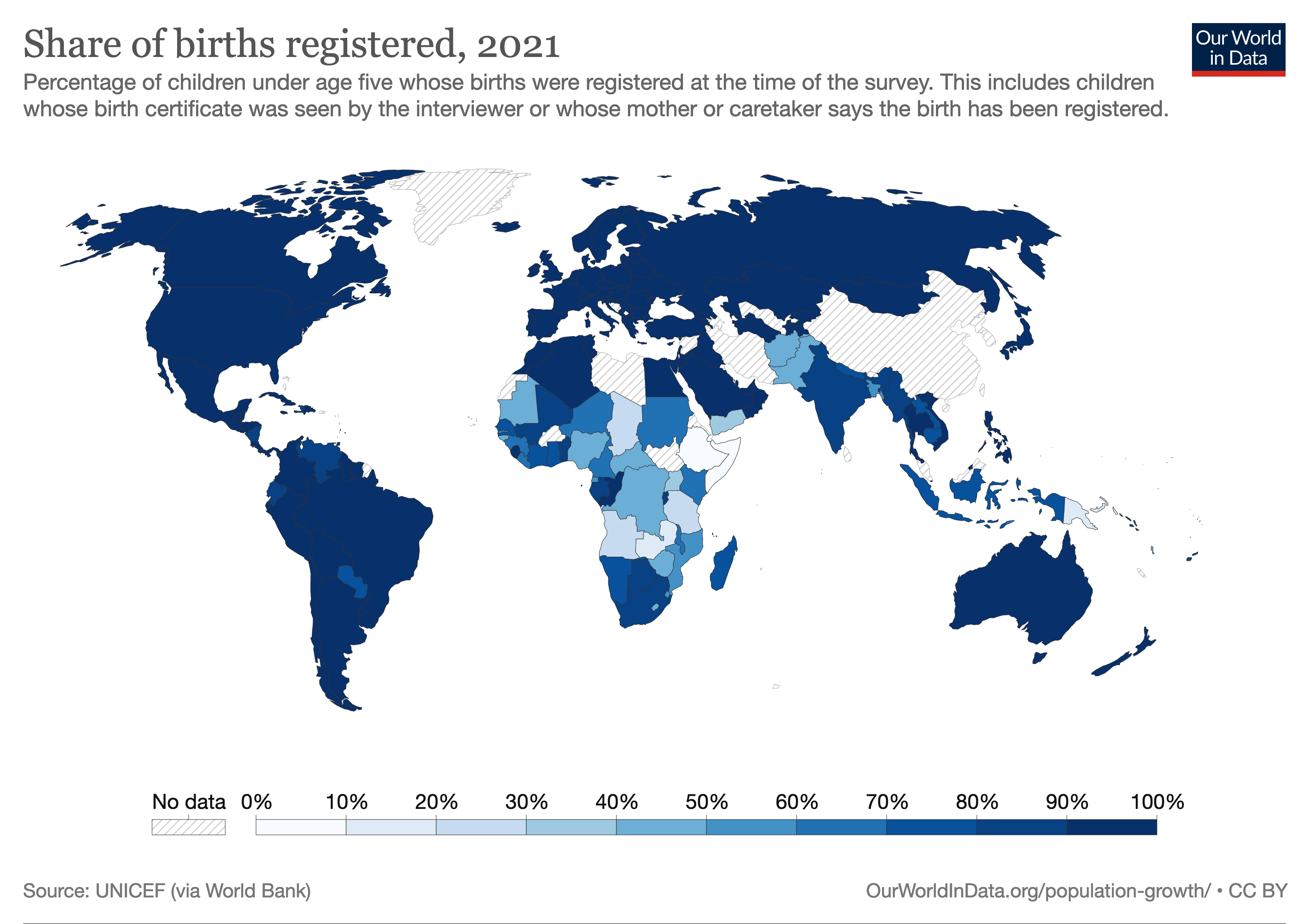
World map for indicator 16.9.1 - Proportion of children under 5 years of age whose births have been registered with a civil authority.

The full text of Target 16.9: "By 2030, provide legal identity for all, including birth registration." It has one indicator:

Indicator 16.9.1 is the "Proportion of children under 5 years of age whose births have been registered with a civil authority, by age".

Different businesses are evaluating the addition of target 16.9 according to their priorities, categories include child protection, economic development, national security, social protection, public health, and so forth. Individuals without proof of legal identity, primarily women and the less fortunate are excluded from the economy.

Target 16.9 overlaps with other SDG targets. For instance, Target 1.3 which implements social protection systems can not be nationally addressed without the vulnerable being able to identify themselves. This is also affiliated with SDG 3 in terms of healthcare and SDG 4 in terms of education. A lack of legal identity can prevent numerous measures that are put in effect to benefit individuals who require it most, creating higher rates of inequality. More than a quarter of children under 5 were unregistered worldwide as of 2015.

People in high-income countries experience a lower prevalence of bribery when using public services compared to those in low-income countries.

=== Target 16.10: Ensure public access to information and protect fundamental freedoms ===
The full text of Target 16.10: "Ensure public access to information and protect fundamental freedoms, in accordance with national legislation and international agreements."

The target has two indicators:

- Indicator 16.10.1 Number of verified cases of killing, kidnapping, enforced disappearance, arbitrary detention and torture of journalists, associated media personnel, trade unionists and human rights advocates in the previous 12 months.
- Indicator 16.10.2 Number of countries that adopt and implement constitutional, statutory and/or policy guarantees for public access to information.

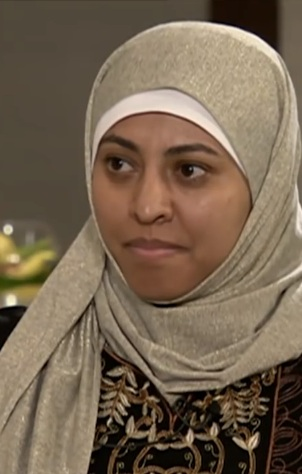
Nadia Al-Sakkaf, Yemen's first female Minister of Information

Rights to information is a fundamental piece of the Universal Declaration of Human Rights. In 2019, the United Nations Educational, Scientific, and Cultural Organization (UNESCO) found that 125 countries have chosen to take up Right to Information(RTI), Access to Information(ATI), or Freedom to Information(FTI) laws or equivalent guarantees. Seventeen countries were found to not have any sort of laws or promises in favor of public access to information. Although a majority of countries globally have adopted RTI related policies, UNESCO identified an issue regarding the sustainability in monitoring and reporting practices on target 16.10. They called for the implementation of oversight bodies, specifically, giving them leadership positions on overseeing progress on the SDG's nationally.

The importance of progressing target 16.10 can be seen through a quote by Nadia Al-Sakkaf, the Republic of Yemen's former Minister of Information, “If information is power then access to information is empowerment.”

=== Target 16.a: Strengthen national institutions to prevent violence and combat crime and terrorism ===
The full text of Target 16.a: "Strengthen relevant national institutions, including through international cooperation, for building capacity at all levels, in particular in developing countries, to prevent violence and combat terrorism and crime." It has one indicator.

Indicator 16.a.1 is the "Existence of independent national human rights institutions in compliance with the Paris Principles".

=== Target 16.b: Promote and enforce non-discriminatory laws and policies ===
The full text of Target 16.b: "Promote and enforce non-discriminatory laws and policies for sustainable development." It has one indicator.

Indicator 16.b.1 is the "Proportion of population reporting having personally felt discriminated against or harassed in the previous 12 months on the basis of a ground of discrimination prohibited under international human rights law".

=== Custodian agencies ===
Custodian agencies are responsible for monitoring and reporting of indicators:

- Indicator 16.1.1: United Nations Office on Drugs and Crime (UNODC) and World Health Organisation (WHO).
- Indicator 16.1.2: Office of the UN High Commissioner for Human Rights (OHCHR)
- Indicator 16.1.3 and 16.1.4: United Nations Office on Drugs and Crime (UNODC)
- Indicator 16.2.1 and 16.2.3: United Nations Children's Emergency Fund (UNICEF)
- Indicators 16.2.2, 16.3.2 and 16.5.1: United Nations Office on Drugs and Crime (UNODC)
- Indicator 16.4.1: United Nations Office on Drugs and Crime (UNODC), and United Nations Conference on Trade and Development (UNTAD)
- Indicator 16.4.2: United Nations Office on Drugs and Crime (UNODC), and United Nations Office for Disarmament Affairs
- Indicator 16.5.2: World Bank (WB) and United Nations Office on Drugs and Crime (UNODC)
- Indicator 16.6.1: World Bank (WB)
- Indicator 16.6.2 and for two indicators under Target 16.7: United Nations Development Programme (UNDP)
- Indicator 16.8.1: Department of Economic and Social Affairs-Financing for Development Office (DESA/FFDO)
- Indicator 16.9.1: Department of Economic and Social Affairs-Statistics Division (DESA/UNSD) and United Nations Children's Emergency Fund (UNICEF)
- Indicator 16.10.1, 16.a.1 and 16.b.1: Office of the UN High Commissioner for Human Rights (OHCHR)
- Indicator 16.10.2: United Nations Educational, Scientific, and Cultural Organization (UNESCO)

== Monitoring and progress ==
High-level progress reports for all the SDGs are published in the form of reports by the United Nations Secretary General. The most recent one is from April 2020.

The International Programme for the Development of Communication is responsible for the follow-up of the SDG 16 through indicators 16.10.1 and 16.10.2. Every two years, a report containing information from the Member States on the status of judicial inquiries on each of the killings condemned by UNESCO is submitted to the IPDC Council by UNESCO's Director-General. The journalists safety indicators is a tool developed by UNESCO which, according to UNESCO's website, aims on mapping the key features that can help assess the safety of journalists, and help determine whether adequate follow-up is given to crimes committed against them. The IPDC Talks also allow the Programme to raise awareness on the importance of access to information. The IPDC also monitors and reports on access to information laws around the world through the United Nations Secretary-General global report on follow-up to SDGs.

A meta-analysis in 2022 investigated the political impacts of the SDGs, and in particular if the SDGs have "fostered a better inclusion and support of poor and vulnerable communities within countries". The researchers found that vulnerable people and the least developed countries are theoretically given priority in the implementation of the SDGs. However, existing norms and institutions for inclusiveness have not been improved by the SDG process.

== Challenges ==
The global COVID-19 pandemic is predicted to increase the frequency of conflicts as countries blame others for their situation. The Russian invasion of Ukraine in 2022 has also caused a major setback, in particular accounting for most of the 53% increase in civilian conflict deaths that year.

== Links with other SDGs ==
The Sustainable Development Goals are not taken as being completely independent one from the other, but rather as being closely linked. In this way, media development enhances freedom of speech, peace, but also contributes to sustainability, poverty eradication and human rights. Fostering peace and inclusive societies can help reduce inequalities (SDG10) and help economies prosper (SDG8). The 2012 outcome document of the United Nations Summit on the 2030 Agenda considers that sustainable development can not be achieved without building peaceful, just and inclusive societies and addressing issues of corruption, poor governance, insecurity and injustice.

== Organizations ==
The United Nations Development Programme (UNDP) is the United Nations global development network which is concerned with SDG 16. Hence, the Program focuses on democratic governance and peace building. The UNDP also works on conflict prevention by empowering youth, especially women. Also, they aim at supporting the frameworks and structure and by acting as mediators.
