= Elie Abel =

Canadian journalist

- Born: October 17, 1920; Montreal, Quebec, Canada
- Died: July 22, 2004 (aged 83); Rockville, Maryland, U.S.
- Occupations: Journalist, Author, Academic
- Spouse: Corinne Abel (m. 1946; died 1991) Charlotte Hammond Page Dunn (m. 1995)
- Writing career
- Period: 1942–1990
- Subject: International Affairs

Elie Abel (October 17, 1920 – July 22, 2004) was a Canadian-American journalist, author and academic.

== Early life ==
Born in Montreal, Quebec, Abel received a Bachelor of Arts degree from McGill University in 1941 and a Master of Science in journalism degree from the Columbia University Graduate School of Journalism in 1942. He worked as a reporter for the Windsor Star in Windsor, Ontario, for a year, then served in the Royal Canadian Air Force during World War II.

== Career ==
After the war, Abel returned to work as a reporter, writing successively for the Montreal Gazette, the North American Newspaper Alliance in Berlin, the Los Angeles Times, and for the Overseas News Agency as its United Nations correspondent.

In 1949 he joined the staff of The New York Times, serving as a national and foreign correspondent for 11 years. After working in Detroit and Washington, he became the Times bureau chief in Belgrade, where he contributed to the paper's Pulitzer Prize-winning coverage of the 1956 Hungarian revolt. In 1958, he went to New Delhi, India, as bureau chief and in that capacity covered the Chinese takeover of Tibet. In 1959, he returned to the United States to take over the Washington bureau of the Detroit News as its chief, serving only two years before being recruited in 1961 as State Department correspondent for NBC News. Distinguishing himself as a diplomatic correspondent, he was ultimately promoted to chief of the network's London bureau.

During his years as a journalist, both in print and broadcasting, Abel was recognized for incisive in-depth reports on international affairs, and particularly on the subject of communism.

Leaving broadcast journalism for academia in 1970, Abel was appointed dean of Columbia University's Graduate School of Journalism and Godfrey Lowell Cabot Professor of Journalism. Abel left Columbia for Stanford University in 1979 as the first Harry and Norman Chandler Professor of Communication.

From 1977 to 1980 Abel served as the representative from the United States to the United Nations' International Commission for the Study of Communication Problems, which published the "MacBride Report" in 1980.

From 1983 to 1986, Abel headed Stanford's Department of Communication and also served as Faculty Senate chair in 198 and 1986. Abel directed Stanford's program in Washington, D.C., in 1993 and 1994.

== Personal life ==
Abel's first wife, Corinne, died in 1991 after 45 years of marriage. When he died, he had been married to Charlotte Hammond Page Dunn for nine years.

== Death ==
Abel died on July 22, 2004, at the Casey House hospice in Rockville, Maryland, at age 83, from the effects of Alzheimer's disease.

== Books ==
- The Shattered Bloc - Behind the Upheaval in Eastern Europe. New York: Houghton Mifflin Company, Boston, 1990, ISBN 0-395-42019-9
- Leaking: Who Does It? Who Benefits? At What Cost?. New York: Priority Press, 1987, 0-870-78219-3
- What's News: The Media in American Society. San Francisco: Institute for Contemporary Studies, 1981.
- Special Envoy to Churchill and Stalin, 1941-1946, with Averell Harriman, New York: Random House, 1975, ISBN 0-394-48296-4
- Roots of Involvement: The U.S. in Asia 1784-1971, with Marvin Kalb, New York: W. W. Norton, 1971.
- The Missile Crisis. New York: Bantam, 1966.

== Awards ==
- First Amendment Defender Award, The Catholic University of America's Columbus School of Law, 1984.
- Overseas Press Club Award, 1969 & 1970.
- Grand Prize for Freedom, Inter American Press Association, 1997.
- George Foster Peabody Award for Radio News, Henry W. Grady College of Journalism and Mass Communication at University of Georgia, 1968
- Pulitzer Prize for International Reporting (contributor), 1956.
