= Mustapha Masmoudi =

Tunisian politician and diplomat

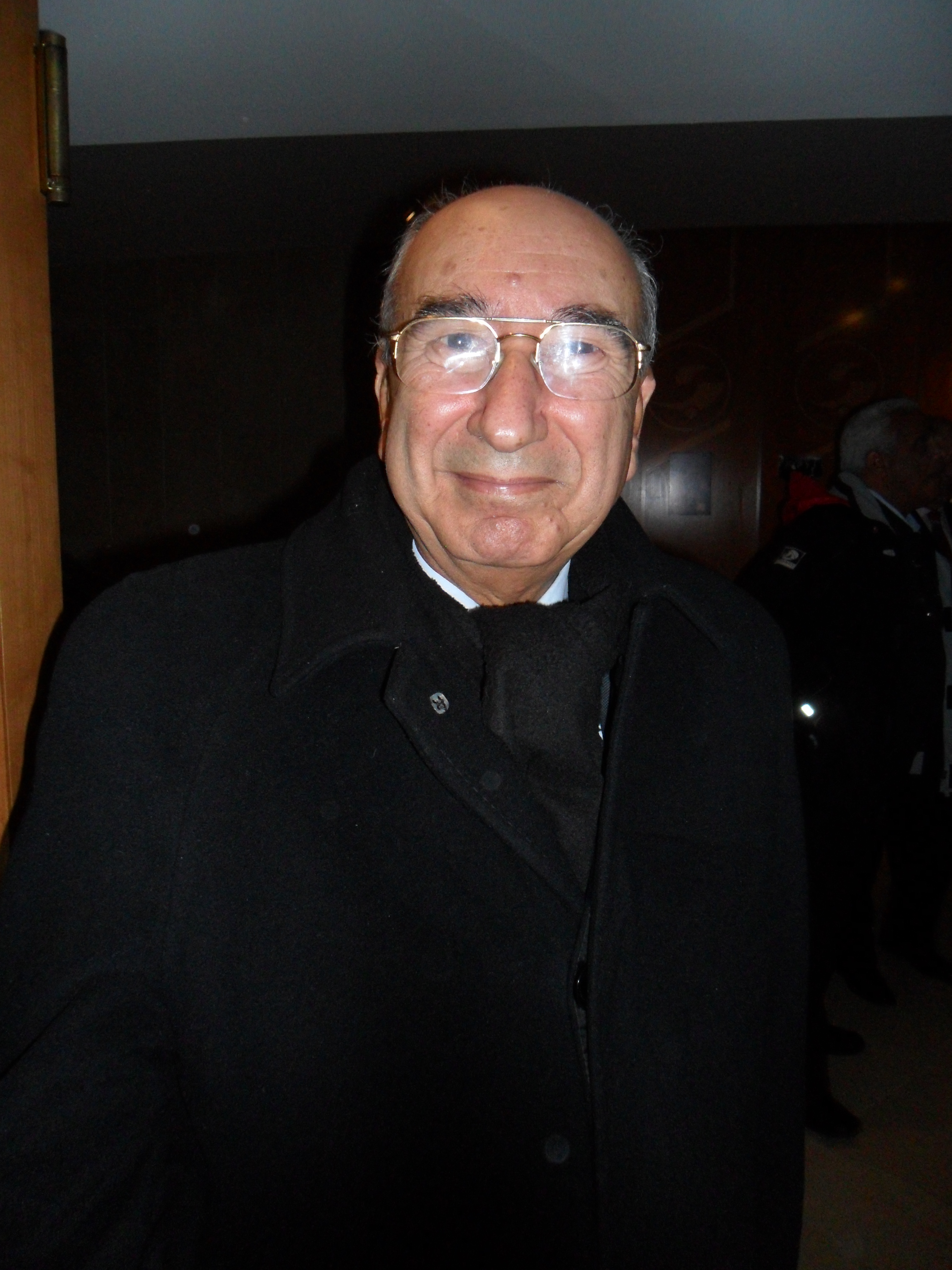
- Born: May 23, 1937; Sfax
- Died: September 26, 2013 (aged 76)
- Occupations: Politician; Diplomat; Writer

Mustapha Masmoudi (May 23, 1937 – September 26, 2013) was a Tunisian politician and diplomat. He was Secretary of State for Information under Hédi Nouira, before becoming Tunisia's Permanent Representative to UNESCO. He is best known for his articulation of the need for a 'New International Information Order' to safeguard the interests of non-aligned countries.

== Life ==
Mustapha Masmoudi was born on May 23, 1937, in Sfax. He studied law and economics at the University of Tunis, graduating in 1963. He then became a civil servant, rising through several posts before becoming President and Director General of Tunis Afrique Presse in February 1974. In September 1974 he was appointed Secretary of State for Information.

Masmoudi's efforts led to UNESCO establishing an International Commission for the Study of Communication Problems in 1977. Masmoudi was a member of the Commission, and contributed an appendix to its 1980 report, the MacBride Report.

He died 26 September 2013 in Tunis.

== Works ==
- Economie de l'information en Tunisie, 1975
- 'The New World Information Order', Journal of Communication, Vol. 29, No. 2 (Spring 1979), p. 183.
- النظام الإعلامي الجديد [The New Media System], 1985
- Voie libre pour monde multiple, 1986
