= Media imperialism =

Area in the international political economy of communications

Media imperialism is an area in the international political economy of communications research tradition that focuses on how "all Empires, in territorial or nonterritorial forms, rely upon communications technologies and mass media industries to expand and shore up their economic, geopolitical, and cultural influence." In the main, most media imperialism research examines how the unequal relations of economic, military and cultural power between an imperialist country and those on the receiving end of its influence tend to be expressed and perpetuated by mass media and cultural industries.

In the 1970s, research on media imperialism was mainly concerned with the expansion of US-based news and entertainment corporations, business models, and products into postcolonial countries as related to the problems of communication and media sovereignty, national identity formation and democracy. In the 21st century, research on media imperialism probes the whole gamut of the media, for example, how an Empire's global economic, military and cultural expansion and legitimization is supported by "the news, telecommunications, film and TV, advertising and public relations, music, interactive games, and internet platforms and social media sites."

For the past seventy years, media imperialism research has been undertaken by a wide range of international communication and media studies scholars, North and South. Some of the key researchers in this area are: Oliver Boyd-Barrett, Luis R. Beltrán and Elizabeth Fox, Ariel Dorfman, Thomas Guback, Cees Hamelink, Dal Yong Jin, Armand Mattelart, Robert W. McChesney, Tom McPhail, Toby Miller and Richard Maxwell, Tanner Mirrlees, David Morley, Graham Murdock, Kaarle Nordenstreng, Herbert I. Schiller, Dallas Smythe, Colin Sparks, Daya Thussu, and Jeremy Tunstall.

== History of the concept ==
The concept of media imperialism emerged in the 1970s, although earlier developments laid the groundwork for its formulation. In 1961, the Non-Aligned Movement was established by states that were not formally aligned with any major power bloc. These countries advocated for a “middle course” in global communication, seeking greater autonomy for developing nations within the international media system.

During the 1970s, political leaders, media practitioners, and intellectuals in postcolonial countries increasingly criticized the concentration of ownership and control held by Western, particularly American, media corporations over global communication networks. At the time, there was a significant imbalance in the flow of news, with information predominantly moving from developed Western countries to the developing world, reportedly at a ratio of approximately 10:1.

In response, representatives from postcolonial nations proposed the NWICO at UNESCO as an effort to address these structural inequalities. Supported by the Many Voices, One World, countries such as India, Indonesia, and Egypt argued for policies that would strengthen national communication systems and protect cultural sovereignty. They emphasized that control over media and information was closely tied to broader goals of political independence, economic development, and cultural identity.

NWICO aimed to promote a more balanced flow of information, enhance the sovereignty of national media systems, and encourage cultural diversity. However, the proposal faced strong opposition from countries such as the United States and the United Kingdom, which supported the principle of a “free flow” of information and market-based communication systems. Critics of NWICO in the West argued that it could lead to restrictions on press freedom, while supporters contended that the “free flow” principle primarily reinforced existing power imbalances.

Amid these tensions, the United States and the United Kingdom withdrew from UNESCO in 1985, citing concerns over censorship and limitations on press freedom. The NWICO initiative gradually declined thereafter. The United States later rejoined UNESCO in 2002 under the presidency of George W. Bush.

== Key theorists and concepts ==
=== Herbert I. Schiller ===
In Mass Communication and American Empire, Herbert I. Schiller emphasized the significance of the mass media and cultural industries to American imperialism, arguing that "each new electronic development widens the perimeter of American influence," and declaring that "American power, expressed industrially, militarily and culturally has become the most potent force on earth and communications have become a decisive element in the extension of United States world power."

In his 1976 book Communication and Cultural Domination, Schiller conveyed the very first definition of cultural imperialism, describing it as:

the sum processes by which a society is brought into the modern [U.S.-centered] world system and how its dominating stratum is attracted, pressured, forced, and sometimes bribed into shaping social institutions to correspond to, or even promote, the values and structures of the dominating centres of the system. The public media are the foremost example of operating enterprises that are used in the penetrative process. For penetration on a significant scale the media themselves must be captured by the dominating/penetrating power. This occurs largely through the commercialization of broadcasting.

For Schiller, cultural imperialism refers to the American Empire's "coercive and persuasive agencies, and their capacity to promote and universalize an American 'way of life' in other countries without any reciprocation of influence." According to Schiller, cultural imperialism "pressured, forced and bribed" societies to integrate with the U.S.'s expansive capitalist model but also incorporated them with attraction and persuasion by winning "the mutual consent, even solicitation of the indigenous rulers." In some ways, Schiller's early definition of cultural imperialism is akin to Joseph Nye's more recent idea of soft power in international relations.

The historical contexts, iterations, complexities, and politics of Schiller's foundational and substantive theorization of cultural imperialism in international communication and media studies are discussed in detail by political economy of communication researchers Richard Maxwell, Vincent Mosco, Graham Murdock, and Tanner Mirrlees.

=== Oliver Boyd-Barrett ===
In 1977, Oliver Boyd-Barrett described media imperialism as the unequal and asymmetrical power relationship between different countries and their media systems. Boyd-Barrett defined media imperialism as "a process whereby the ownership, structure, distribution or content of the media in any one country are singly or together subject to substantial pressure from the media interests of any other country or countries without proportionate reciprocation of influence by the country so affected." Boyd-Barrett emphasized how the corporations that owned the mass media in imperial countries such as the United States (but not exclusively the United States) were also exerting ownership over the mass media in smaller countries while shaping their media business "models", production standards, and formats. From the late 1970s to the 2020s, Boyd-Barrett authored and edited numerous books and volumes on continuity and change in media imperialism.

=== Tom McPhail ===
In 1987, Tom McPhail defined cultural imperialism as "electronic colonialism", or, "the dependency relationship established by the importation of communication hardware, foreign-produced software, along with engineers, technicians, and related information protocols, that establish a set of foreign norms, values, and expectations which, in varying degrees, may alter the domestic cultures and socialization processes."

=== Paul Siu-Nam ===
In 1988, Paul Siu-Nam Lee observed that "communication imperialism can be defined as the process in which the ownership and control over the hardware and software of mass media as well as other major forms of communication in one country are singly or together subjugated to the domination of another country with deleterious effects on the indigenous values, norms and culture."

=== John Downing and Annabelle Sreberny-Mohammadi ===
In 1995, John Downing and Annabelle Sreberny-Mohammadi said: "Imperialism is the conquest and control of one country by a more powerful one. Cultural imperialism signifies the dimensions of the process that go beyond economic exploitation or military force. In the history of colonialism, (i.e., the form of imperialism in which the government of the colony is run directly by foreigners), the educational and media systems of many Third World countries have been set up as replicas of those in Britain, France, or the United States and carry their values. Western advertising has made further inroads, as have architectural and fashion styles. Subtly but powerfully, the message has often been insinuated that Western cultures are superior to the cultures of the Third World."

Needless to say, all these international communication and media studies researchers agree that cultural imperialism is undertaken by the world system's dominant imperial countries with and through the available and new means of communications and mass media, and often to the detriment of the countries on the receiving end of this process.

=== Tanner Mirrlees ===
In 2016, Tanner Mirrlees redefined media imperialism in a historical study of how the US national security State partners with US-based yet globalizing media corporations to spread media and cultural goods intended to organize trans-national consent to American foreign policy. Building upon the political economy of communications scholarship of Herbert I. Schiller, Mirrlees argues that although the US government and media corporations pursue different interests on the world stage (the former, national security, and the latter, profit), they often collaborate to support the co-production and global distribution-exhibition of Empire-extolling media and popular cultural goods. Mirrlees focuses on four dimensions of media imperialism: 1. a structural alliance and symbiotic relationship between the US nation-state (pursuing its geopolitical interests in world affairs) and US-headquartered media and cultural industries (pursuing their economic interests in world markets); 2. the US nation-state's geopolitical support for the trans-national economic dominance of the US-based media and cultural industries; 3. the US media and cultural industries' support for the US nation-state's international propaganda, "soft power" and public diplomacy campaigns in other countries; and, 4. American media and cultural products whose messages and imagery is intentionally or inadvertently functional to the glorification and legitimization of the US Empire. Although Mirrlees' study focuses on the specificity of American media imperialism and the role of the media and cultural industries to US economic, military and cultural-ideological power, the four dimensions of media imperialism it identifies may be evident in the practices of other old and new imperialist powers.

=== Dal Yong Jin ===
In 2015, Dal Yong Jin extended the concept of media imperialism to encompass the growing global power of US-based Internet and social media platform corporations such as Google, Apple, Facebook. Jin argues that a handful of corporations based in "Western countries are the world's dominant digital platform owners and operators and a large number of non-Western countries are digital platform users." In the book Digital Platforms, Imperialism and Political Culture, Jin conceptualizes "platform imperialism" as "an asymmetrical relationship of interdependence between the West, primarily the US, and many developing countries". This asymmetrical platform relationship between the United States and the rest is "characterized in part by unequal technological exchanges and therefore capital flows" and reflects the "technological and symbolic domination of US-based platforms that have greatly influenced the majority of people and countries."

== Criticism of the theory ==
Critics of the media imperialism "theory" have been around since the early 1980s. Often, critics of the media imperialism theory tend to reject or deny that media imperialism exists, or alternately, present a meta-critique of one or more of the statements and claims made by the scholars associated with the media imperialism theory. As summarized by Tanner Mirrlees in Global Entertainment Media: Between Cultural Imperialism and Cultural Globalization, critics of media imperialism theory tend to make one or more of the following points when dismissing media imperialism theory or criticizing it to complicate or revise in some way:

1. The US is not an imperialist power, ergo media imperialism doesn't exist;
2. postcolonial countries such as China and India headquarter large and internationalizing media corporations; the idea that postcolonial countries are victims of a US-centered media imperialism is simplistic and irrelevant in the 21st century;
3. the media and cultural trade relationship between the US and other countries may not be balanced, but there is more than a one way flow of media and cultural goods from the US to the rest: while the US exports a lot of media to the world, it also imports media from the world, suggesting a two-way or multi-directional flow of media goods;
4. consumers around the world are not forced or coerced to watch, listen to and read US media and cultural products; they may select and choose these "foreign" goods instead of "domestic" or nationally made and available media;
5. the texts of US media and cultural products do not communicate a one-dimensional American imperialist ideology to the world; they offer a multiplicity of competing narratives of America, warts and all;
6. the local and national reception contexts for US media and cultural products are complex, as consumers make a wide variety of interpretations of US media and sometimes adapt them to their own local and national cultural environments;
7. political and business elites in countries purportedly afflicted by US media imperialism may weaponize the concept for political ends: the censorship of unwanted or subversive ideas to maintain national propaganda regimes, the protection of fledgling or established national media corporations from international competition, and the promotion of the growth of national media oligopolies, first at home, then abroad.

Scholars of global communication argue that contemporary examples of "contraflows" media content moving from the Global South to the Global North do not necessarily challenge the structural dominance associated with media imperialism. Although networks such as RT, Zee TV, and other regional broadcasters are often framed as counter-hegemonic alternatives to Western media, research shows that many of these outlets remain economically and technologically dependent on Western transnational media corporations. Their operations frequently rely on Western managerial expertise, advertising markets, and distribution infrastructures, and their global reach is typically limited to diaspora communities. As a result, these contraflows tend to function less as genuine oppositions to Western media power and more as "complementary flows" that exist within the larger ecosystem of U.S. and Europe-led media dominance. Scholars note that while globalization has increased the visibility of non-Western cultural products and created spaces for hybridity, Western media organizations continue to set the international cultural agenda, reinforcing the core assumptions of media imperialism.

== United States ==
Most research on media imperialism going back to the 1970s has focused on the significance of the United States and referred to it as the world's most significant media imperialist. For instance, media corporations based in the United States exert media influence in other countries, especially those lacking strong media industries. A major cultural influencer in other countries is television. Specifically in relation to news and entertainment American TV has a strong presence in the international arena. American news networks like CNN often have large international staffs, and produce specialized regional programming for many nations.

Movies produced by major Hollywood studios and distributors have presence and popularity around the world. For example, Hollywood is a major producer of films, which tend to be high quality and are released internationally. Hollywood relies on four capitalist strategies "to attract and integrate non-US film producers, exhibitors and audiences into its ambit: ownership, cross-border productions with subordinate service providers, content licensing deals with exhibitors, and blockbusters designed to travel the globe." Hollywood's dominance is not total, as other countries have their own film industries: "Bollywood", for example, describes India's Hindi-language film industry, which is large and prosperous.

Another form of mass media used for media imperialism is music. Much of today's, and older, American music finds itself popular in other countries. However, in the "British Invasion" of the 1960s, British music became popular in the United States. Since then, there has not been such a large shift of imperialism.

Overall, American media imperialism can be seen as a positive and a negative. Negative views towards it stem from the negative connotation of the word 'imperialism'. This word is associated with political imperialism, in which a large country creates an empire out of smaller ones. However, media imperialism can be seen as a positive when it is viewed as a way to create a consensus narrative. A consensus narrative is a result of "products that provide us with shared experiences". By having similar experiences, it opens the gateway for communication and development of relationships. Yet, this can also become a problem when the cultural exchange is not balanced or reciprocated. American culture is being transmitted to other countries, but other cultures may not be received in return.

== Digital imperialism (digital colonialism) ==
Digital imperialism, sometimes called digital colonialism, happens when powerful countries or major tech companies, such as those in the U.S. or China, control a large-scale digital system, such as things like social media platforms, internet infrastructure, cloud services, AI tools, etc. While "digital imperialism" emphasizes their global influence and reach, the term "digital colonialism" highlights how this control can create dependency, extract data, and limit a smaller nations' ability to develop their own digital systems, similar to historical patterns of colonialism. This often forces the smaller countries to rely only on foreign platforms and services instead of creating their own, which creates uneven power dynamics and reduces their digital independence. Scholars may debate which term is most accurate as some prefer "digital imperialism" to stress the economic and cultural influence, while others prefer "digital colonialism" to focus on the more structural control, surveillance, and the extraction of digital resources. Overall, these dynamics can shape the cultural content, silence local voices, and reinforce global inequalities by allowing a few dominant in control actors to set the rules of the newly digital world.

Several countries have pushed back against actions considered to be digital imperialism over the last several years, notably Facebook's (later Meta) attempt to introduce Internet.org (later Free Basics) to India in 2015. The initial intention of the program was to increase Internet accessibility to citizens who may not have a consistent source of connection. The service offered access to a limited number of websites, and critics argued that it favored Facebook's own platform while raising concerns about net neutrality and unequal access. India’s telecom regulator effectively banned the service, Facebook ultimately withdrew Free Basics from India on February 11, 2016.

Streaming services and social media platforms like Netflix, YouTube, and TikTok are recent examples of digital imperialism. Countries around the world consume billions of dollars worth of media produced by western platforms and companies. These platforms' hold outsized influence over the tastes and preferences of other countries' entertainment, culture, and social media behaviour. Streaming service markets are challenging for domestic companies to compete with due to their size and resources of these tech giants. Some countries are also dependent on using social media platforms rather than creating infrastructure of their own.

== See also ==
- American imperialism
- Cultural Imperialism
- Electronic colonialism
- Academic imperialism
- Soft Power
- Concentration of media ownership
- Manufacturing Consent
- Radio homogenization
- NWICO
- Gleichschaltung
