= International Programme for the Development of Communication =

UNESCO programme for the development of mass media in developing countries

Logo of UNESCO

The International Programme for the Development of Communication is a United Nations Educational, Scientific and Cultural Organization (UNESCO) programme aimed at strengthening the development of mass media in developing countries.

== Background ==
On December 10, 1948, Article 19 of the Universal Declaration of Human Rights was adopted and proclaimed by the United Nations General Assembly as Resolution 217 A (III). It stated that "Everyone has the right to freedom of opinion and expression; this right includes freedom to hold opinions without interference and to seek, receive and impart information and ideas through any media and regardless of frontiers."

In 1977, UNESCO initiated the International Commission for the Study of Communications Problems, known as the MacBride Commission and named after the commission's Chairman Seán MacBride. The commission was given a three-year time frame to conduct investigations and report back to UNESCO. In October 1980, the report Many Voices, One World was presented at the Belgrade Assembly.

As a result of the report, UNESCO launched the International Programme for the Development of Communication (IPDC). The programme web site states that it "exists to strengthen the means of mass communication in developing countries, by increasing technical and human resources for the media, by developing community media and by modernising news agencies and broadcasting organizations."

At the November 1987 General Conference at Paris, UNESCO called for the continuation of its major plan called Communication in the Service of Man in which it re-affirmed that "it is essential gradually to eliminate existing imbalances in the field of communication, in particular by fostering the development of infrastructures, the training of people and the strengthening of production and dissemination capacities in the developing countries, and to encourage a free flow and a wider and better balanced dissemination of information, with a view to the establishment of a new world information and communication order seen as an evolving and continuous process."

At the June 2004 session of the UN General Assembly, it was "decided to maintain the Committee to Review United Nations Public Information Policies and Activities" with a mandate including "To promote the establishment of a new, more just and more effective world information and communication order intended to strengthen peace and international understanding and based on the free circulation and wider and better-balanced dissemination of information and to make recommendations thereon to the General Assembly."

It has been said that the "results of UNESCO's McBride Report regarding media diversity alerted UNESCO, and other international bodies to the necessity for a New World Information and Communication Order (NWICO)."

However, "Despite UNESCO's attempt to protect independent and national news agencies from being dominated by western news agencies and networks, the NWICO policy was boycotted by America and Britain, who withdrew their membership from UNESCO and funding of the organisation's initiatives. Although Britain rejoined UNESCO in 1997, the global media owners' opposition towards the NWICO policy (which collapsed thereafter) highlights their commercial stronghold in the international news market." (The USA also rejoined UNESCO, in 2003.)

In order to achieve its mission the IPDC elaborates several development projects worldwide and develops special initiatives related to its mandate.

== Mandate ==
The International Programme for Development Communication (IPDC) was created by the UNESCO General Conference in 1980 as an intergovernmental body. It has an elected Council of 39 Member State delegates which elects the eight members of the Bureau, and a Secretariat. Its mandate since 2003 is “... to contribute to sustainable development, democracy and good governance by fostering universal access to and distribution of information and knowledge by strengthening the capacities of the developing countries and countries in transition in the field of electronic media and the printed press.”

=== Sustainable Development Goal 16 ===
The IPDC is responsible for targets 10.1 and 10.2 of the Sustainable Development Goal 16 (or SDG 16). SDG 16 called “peace, justice and strong institutions” aims to “promote peaceful and inclusive societies for sustainable development, provide access to justice for all and build effective, accountable and inclusive institutions”. More specifically, SDG 16.10 aims to: “Ensure public access to information and protect fundamental freedoms, in accordance with national legislation and international agreements”.

The two indicators related to the target are:

- SDG 16.10.1: “Number of verified cases of killing, kidnapping, enforced disappearance, arbitrary detention and torture of journalists, associated media personnel, trade unionists and human rights advocates in the previous 12 months”;
- SDG 16.10.2: “Number of countries that adopt and implement constitutional, statutory and/or policy guarantees for public access to information”.

== Composition ==
The IPDC is mainly composed of the Intergovernmental Council and of the Bureau of the Intergovernmental Council. The Council normally meets in plenary session in November every two years, and the Bureau annually in March. The Bureau discharges duties decided by the council and has full responsibility for Project selection, approval and allocation of funds.

=== The Intergovernmental Council of the IPDC ===
The IPDC Council comprises 39 Member State delegates elected every two years from the UNESCO General Conference, and submits to it a report on its activities. The Council elects a chair, who is also Chair of the Bureau. The council, according to the Statutes as amended in 2003, is responsible for:

- Policy-making, guiding the planning and the implementation of the Programme;
- Approving priorities;
- Reviewing and assessing achievements on the basis of implementation and evaluation reports on projects and defining basic areas requiring increased international cooperation;
- Reviewing ways and means whereby Member States might participate more effectively;
- Approving an appropriate system of IPDC financing to secure the resources needed.

=== The Bureau of the Intergovernemental Council of the IPDC ===
The Bureau members comprise the Chair of the Bureau, three vice-chairpersons, a Rapporteur and three other members, giving a total of eight who remain in office until a new Bureau is elected. The Bureau with Secretariat support is the appropriate body to submit proposals for a strategic framework to the council for consideration.

== Journalism ==
=== Safety of journalists ===
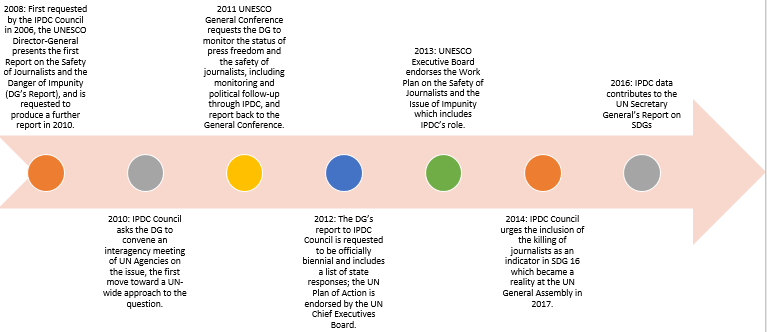
IPDC's safety of journalists Special Initiative evolution has grown in significance and scope since its origins.

Safety of journalists is a special initiative of the International Programme for the Development of Communication (IPDC). Safety of journalists is the ability for journalists and media professionals to receive, produce and share information without facing physical or moral threats. It includes a mix of international, regional and local prevention mechanisms intended to protect journalist, raise awareness on the violence they might face and promote freedom of expression. The International Programme for the Development of Communication (IPDC) develops projects to address issues of safety of journalism and impunity in the field. Since 2008, the IPDC has encouraged Member States to submit information, on a voluntary basis, on the status of the judicial inquiries conducted on each of the killings condemned by UNESCO, for inclusion in a public report submitted every two years to the IPDC Council by the Director-General. The IPDC's 2016 Report is summarized in the "Time to break the cycle of violence against journalists" publication which highlights key findings, provides analysis of the killings, and of Member States responses.

==== UNESCO’s Director-General Report on killing of journalists ====
Data on killings is gathered and verified for the Director-General's report and World Trends from multiple sources, including NGOs, UNESCO Field Offices and UNESCO Permanent Delegations. The Director-General further requests a report from States on the status of investigations into these killings. State responses are categorized as: i) no information received from the relevant State on the judicial enquiry's status; ii) the case, subject to specific official information being provided, is ongoing or unresolved; or iii) the case is resolved through conviction, the death of a suspect, or a judicial decision that the death was not related to journalistic practice. The response rate of states has risen from 30% in 2013 to 74.5% in 2017.

In addition to feeding into the Director Generals’ Report biennially, the data gathered is used in several ways. It is formally submitted to the IPDC Council, contributes to the World Trends report; it feeds into UNESCO's contribution to the global monitoring of SDG indicator 16.10.1; it is used as an input for UNESCO's submissions to the Universal Periodic Report of the United Nations Human Rights Council.

==== Strengthening national mechanisms to promote the safety of journalists ====
The IPDC's strategy since 2017 to enhance safety of journalists at national levels is to strengthen national mechanisms that promote safety and combat impunity for crimes against journalists. This was further highlighted during the November 2017 Eastern African Conference on National Mechanisms for Safety of journalists with the Nairobi Declaration during which Eastern African countries called for the establishment of national mechanisms. Toby Mendel considers that “making sure that relevant stakeholders are effectively integrated into a safety mechanism can dramatically increase its chances of succeeding by harnessing the skills, resources, and support of different stakeholders, and by promoting coordination as opposed to duplication or even competition”. These mechanisms include capacity building, legislative reforms, monitoring, training, and the provision by media companies of protective equipment.

=== Global Initiative for Excellence in Journalism Education (GIEJE) ===
The Global Initiative for Excellence in Journalism Education (GIEJE) is an IPDC special initiative since 2007 supporting journalism education as “essential to bring out the potential of media systems to foster democracy, dialogue and development”. This special initiative is built on work relating to the publication “Model Curriculum for Journalism Education” and established Criteria and Indicators for Quality Journalism Training Institutions. The Model Curricula is an IPDC publication launched in 2007 at the request of Member States at the first World Journalism Education Congress (WJEC-1) convened in Singapore. It provides frameworks for specialized syllabi in order to set standards based on good practice internationally, as a resource on which stakeholders around the world can draw to improve the quality of journalism education in their countries. By the end of 2012, they had been adapted by at least seventy journalism schools in sixty countries in diverse linguistic, social and cultural contexts. Work towards this special initiative also include the UNESCO Series on Journalism Education, Centres of excellence in journalism education, staff training, learning materials and resources, enhancing institutional governance and management systems, media monitoring, creating networks between journalism education institutions and media.

Journalism Curriculum Development in Nairobi In 2013, the School of Journalism & Mass Communication, University of Nairobi developed a curriculum on conflict reporting, bringing together experts who had developed the training material and providing training at a regional conference on the topic.

== Media Development ==
This was the first of the IPDC Special Initiatives, initiated by the Council in 2006 and launched in 2008 after a period of research, drafting and consultation. The framework is built on UNESCO's Constitutional mandate to foster “the unrestricted pursuit of objective truth”, “the free exchange of ideas and knowledge” and “the free flow of ideas by word and image”. It has been applied in over 20 countries and assessments are ongoing in 18 more.

The indicators cover the media sector as a whole, under five categories:

- Legal and regulatory framework governing media;
- Degree of plurality and diversity of the media;
- Capacity of media to function as a platform for democratic discourse;
- Professional capacities;
- Technical capacities.

=== The Media Development projects ===
The IPDC supports several media development projects in all five United Nations regions, involving:

- Training Judicial Authorities in Africa:
- Support to UNESCO Conferences
- IPDC Talks in the field
- Access to Information in Afghanistan e.g. Radio Begum
- Capacity support in IPDC Secretariat
- Gender and Media Project: Fostering gender balance and sensitivity in media in Asia
- Gender and Media Project: Fostering balanced and fair gender portrayal in Jordanian media content
- Promoting freedom of expression and the safety of journalists in Ukraine
- Establishment and reinforcement of national safety mechanisms
- Gender and Media Project: Strengthening IPDC-GAMAG partnership for gender-transformative media development

=== Knowledge-Driven Media Development (KDMD) ===
Knowledge-Driven Media Development (KDMD) is an IPDC special initiative agreed on at the 57th meeting of the IPDC Bureau in March 2013. The framework promotes a “knowledge-driven”, “context-sensitive” media development approach, that takes into account “the challenges and opportunities of the media environment”.

== Media and Internet Indicators ==
=== The Media Development indicators (MDI) ===
The Media Development indicators (MDI) were developed by the IPDC Intergovernmental Council 2006 in line with IPDC's priority areas of promotion of freedom of expression and media pluralism, development of community media, and human resources development. In a 2013 assessment of the impact of the MDIs, outcomes were identified based on interviews with UNESCO HQ and Field Staff and over a dozen media development experts. The first refers to the specific impacts of the MDIs, such as:

- In Bhutan, the MDI completed in 2010 contributed to amending a media law to create an Independent Press Council; and an IPDC Project, run by the World Association of Community Radio Broadcasters (AMARC) in 2012, instigated a process introducing community radio as a third tier of broadcasting. The first two stations were opened in 2016.
- The MDI in Tunisia in 2012, part of a wider IPDC Special Initiative after the Arab Spring, combined with other social forces outlined the role of the MDI as an advocacy tool.
- In Gabon, where MDI recommendations are on the webpage of the Ministry of Digital Economy, the government has started to fund community media.
- In the Maldives, the decriminalization of defamation in 2011 can “in part be attributed [to] one of the MDI report’s recommendations”, according to the Evaluation of the International Programme for the Development of Communication published in 2018.

A second point of influence of MDIs aims at purposes other than enhancing government policy. The third type of outcome noted by the report is the enhancement of dialogue, empowerment and capacity building. In Côte d'Ivoire, the process of consultations initiated by the MDIs resulted in the creation by the government of a Media Development Committee comprising both government and non-governmental organizations.

=== Journalism Safety indicators ===
Based on their Media Development indicators, UNESCO's IPDC developed the Journalists Safety Indicators (JSI). According to UNESCO's website, its purpose is to "pinpoint significant matters that show, or impact upon, the safety of journalists and the issue of impunity". These indicators aims on mapping the key features that can help assess safety of journalists, and determining whether adequate follow-up is given to crimes committed against them. Analysis based on the Journalists Safety indicators have been conducted in Guatemala (2013), Kenya (2016), Nepal (2016), Pakistan (2013-2014).

In Pakistan an IPDC Project was used to enhance mechanisms to monitor attacks on journalists by the Rural Media Network Programme, and to provide training on safety awareness especially for women journalists;

In Colombia in 2014, an IPDC Project implemented by Fundación para la libertad de Prensa, developed and implemented for four major media outlets a digital safety strategy, including a safety guide and building in the use of a safety app for journalists. In Palestine, IPDC supported risk assessment and safety training among independent Gazan journalists, undertaken by the Ma’an Network.

=== Internet Universality indicators ===
Internet Universality is the concept that "the Internet is much more than infrastructure and applications, it is a network of economic and social interactions and relationships, which has the potential to enable human rights, empower individuals and communities, and facilitate sustainable development. The concept is based on four principles stressing the Internet should be Human rights-based, Open, Accessible, and based on Multistakeholder participation. These have been abbreviated as the R-O-A-M principles. Understanding the Internet in this way helps to draw together different facets of Internet development, concerned with technology and public policy, rights and development." UNESCO is developing Internet Universality indicators to help governments and other stakeholders assess their own national Internet environments and to promote the values associated with Internet Universality. The research process was envisioned to include consultations at a range of global forums and a written questionnaire sent to key actors, but also a series of publications on important Internet Freedom related issues as encryption, hate speech online, privacy, digital safety and journalism sources. The outcome of this multidimensional research will be publicized in June 2018. The final indicators will be submitted to the International Programme for Development of Communication for endorsement.

=== The Gender Sensitive indicators for Media ===
The goal of the Gender Sensitive Indicators for Media framework (GSIM) is to contribute to gender equality and women's empowerment in and through media of all kinds. The framework covers two dimensions: gender equality within media organizations; and gender portrayal in media content. It is designed for use by all media organizations. The GSIM has been applied under IPDC on a number of occasions and in different contexts, including the following:

- In 2014, Gender and Media in Southern Africa (GEMSAT) applied it (after refinement for use locally) in Tanzania to seven community radio stations enhancing understanding of the issues and encouraging change.
- In 2015, it was implemented in Paraguay by an NGO, Global News Agency, focusing primarily on content in two each of print and digital media and of television channels, and analyzing over 1,100 articles and 400 advertisements.
- Thai Public Service Broadcasting (TPSB) was established in 2008 partly to become a best practice leader in media. The GSIM fitted well with its goal, and TPSB's training institute implemented it in 2014 - 2015 across six prominent broadcasting outlets both public and commercial. The goal was also to raise awareness among these media organizations, the media regulator and the public.
- In the Dominican Republic in 2014, a Project implemented both the MDI and GSIM by the Dominican College of Journalists, in a wide consultation process.
- A similar Project of the Haiti State University’ Communications Department began in 2016 implementing the GSIM and MDI together, with the goal of producing a set of recommendations to strengthen the development of the media sector and guide future policy.
- In Mongolia, Globe International Centre from 2015 to 2016 took the GSIM and translated it into Mongolian, and piloted it in the public service broadcaster MNB, the private TV station UBS, and the Confederation of Mongolian Journalists.

== See also ==
- Freedom of expression
- Journalism
- Media censorship
