= Amadou-Mahtar M'Bow =

Senegalese politician and civil servant (1921–2024)

Amadou-Mahtar M'Bow GCIH
- M'Bow in 1974

6th Director-General of UNESCO
- In office 1974–1987
- Preceded by: René Maheu
- Succeeded by: Federico Mayor Zaragoza

Personal details
- Born: 20 March 1921 Dakar, French West Africa (now Senegal)
- Died: 24 September 2024 (aged 103) Dakar, Senegal
- Education: Sorbonne University
- Occupation: Politician; diplomat; educator

Amadou-Mahtar M'Bow GCIH (20 March 1921 – 24 September 2024) was a Senegalese civil servant and Director-General of UNESCO. M'bow served in France and North Africa during World War II after volunteering for the French Army, also serving with the Free French, and finally in the French Air Force. After the end of the war, he studied geography at the Sorbonne University in Paris. He served at UNESCO Headquarters in Paris from 1953 to 1987.

== Biography ==
M'Bow was born in Dakar on 20 March 1921. He began working for UNESCO in 1953 and served as its Director-General from 1974 to 1987, being the first black African to head a United Nations organisation. His tenure has been described as marked by an alternative framework for the production of knowledge and information, moving away from Eurocentric tendencies and encouraging the diversity of experiences and cultures. He was President of the PanAfrican Archaeological Association from 1967 to 1971.

In 1978, he made the speech "A plea for the return of an irreplaceable cultural heritage to those who created it", where he called for the restitution of cultural heritage from the northern to the southern hemisphere. His call followed the 1973 resolution no. 3187 about the Restitution of works of art to countries victims of expropriation, but had no decisive effect on restitutions.

In May 1980, M'Bow called the Commission over the Problems of Communication which delivered the MacBride Report (so called after its president, Seán MacBride), supporting international claims for a New World Information and Communication Order. His departure in 1987 followed criticism for administrative and budgetary practices and the US withdrawal from UNESCO in 1984 (followed by the UK in 1985).

In 1980, M'Bow was awarded an honorary doctorate from the University of Belgrade. In February 1981, he was awarded an honorary doctorate from the Rijksuniversiteit Gent (Ghent University). He retired to his home country of Senegal in 1987 and celebrated his 100th birthday in March 2021.

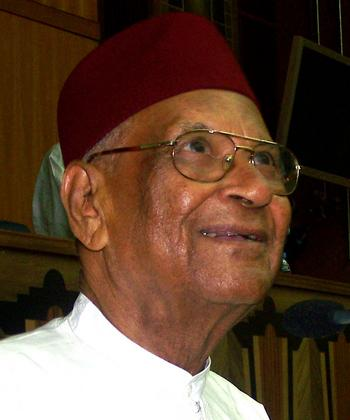
Amadou-Mahtar M'Bow in 2008

M'Bow died on 24 September 2024, at the age of 103.

== Honours ==
- Bolivia: Grand Cross of the Order of the Condor of the Andes
- Bolivia: Grand Cross of the Order of national education
- North Korea: First Class of the Order of the National Flag
- Brazil: Grand Cross of the Order of the Southern Cross
- Ecuador: Grand Cross of National Order of Merit
- France: Commander of the Legion of Honour (2011)
- France: Commander of the Ordre des Palmes académiques
- France: Commander of the Ordre des Arts et des Lettres
- Guinea: Grand Officer of the National Order of Merit (Guinea)
- Mali: Commander of the National Order of Mali
- Peru: Grand-Cross of the Order of the Sun of Peru
- Portugal: Grand-Cross of the Order of Prince Henry (6 April 2017)
- Senegal: Grand-Cross of the National Order of the Lion
- Senegal: Commander of the Order of Academic Palms
- Spain: Grand Cross of Civil Order of Alfonso X, the Wise
- Spain: Medal of the Order of Merit of the Civil Guard (1987)

Government offices
| Preceded by René Maheu | Director-General of UNESCO; 1974–1987 | Succeeded by Federico Mayor Zaragoza |
