= Najia Ashar =

US based Former broadcast journalist of Pakistan Origin

- Born: 14 July 1978 (age 47); Karachi, Pakistan
- Education: Master of Social Science in International Relations
- Occupations: Development Professional, Journalist
- Years active: 2002 - Present
- Organization: Global Neighbourhood for Media Innovation
- Known for: Media, Peace, Training
- Spouse: Ashar Ali
- Children: 2

Najia Ashar (born 14 July 1978) is a broadcast journalist and media development professional with more than 20 years of experience in Pakistan's mainstream media. She is the founder & president of Global Neighbourhood for Media Innovation (GNMI), a Karachi-based nonprofit organization working for media development and peacebuilding in Pakistan.

== Journalism ==
Najia started her news media career in 2002 at state-owned Pakistan Television as a writer and researcher.

As a media professional, she has hosted a number of programs on sensitive human rights issues which included influential stakeholders of the society and worked as a host of a news morning show at GNN TV and served as Editor News Strategy and Planning at Aaj News. She also hosted a daily news show "News Hour With Najia". Prior to that she worked as a news presenter at Geo News for 12 years.

In 2013, she attended the East-West Center media exchange program in Honolulu, Hawaii, She attended Stanford University in 2014-2015 as a Knight Journalism Fellow.

== Education ==
Najia holds a Master's (2000) and bachelor's degree (1999) in International Relations from the University of Karachi.

== Personal life ==
Najia was born in the Qasba Colony, a neighbourhood in Karachi housing diverse ethnic groups. She is married to Ashar Ali, a news executive. The couple has two children.
