= Journalists for Human Rights =

Canadian media development organization

JHR (Journalists for Human Rights)
- Formation: 2002
- Type: non-profit organization
- Headquarters: Toronto, Ontario, Canada
- Website: www.jhr.ca

Journalists for Human Rights (JHR) is an international media development organization based in Toronto, Ontario, Canada. JHR was founded in 2002 by Benjamin Peterson and Alexandra Sicotte-Levesque. JHR's objective is to encourage media to cover human rights stories with the aim of raising awareness to in order to end human rights abuses.

JHR partners with over 400 media organisations in 29 different countries to train over 17,650 journalists. JHR's approach encourages the involvement of local media partnerships and consultations with editors and owners, working journalists, students, civil society and other relevant stakeholders within a region.

== Activities ==
Amongst its activities, JHR has trained thousands of journalists worldwide to report on human rights, including in Mali In the DRC, it has worked with journalists and established press clubs. In Jordan, it has trained journalists, mainly women, and uses the Maidan platform for public engagement. In South Africa, JHR co-founded JAMLab to support media innovation. In Syria, it created a Network of Journalists for Human Rights. In South Sudan, it trained journalists and government officials, increasing reporting on sexual and gender based violence.

In Canada, its Indigenous Reporters Program has trained and provided scholarships and internships to Indigenous journalists. The organisation also organised a nationwide silent protest in 2006 to raise human rights awareness.

== Funding ==
JHR is a registered Canadian charity. It receives funding from international and Canadian agencies and governments, foundations, and individual donors.

Its financial contributors include:

- Accenture
- Airbnb
- BBC
- Bell Media
- Bloomberg News
- Canadian Press
- CBC News
- Coca-Cola Company
- Conrad Black
- CTV News
- Department for International Development (DFID)
- Facebook
- Foreign, Commonwealth and Development Office
- Global Affairs Canada
- Global News
- Globe and Mail
- Google
- Kingdom of the Netherlands
- Law Society of Upper Canada
- Massey College
- National Endowment for Democracy
- National Post
- PayPal
- PwC
- Rogers Communications
- Royal Bank of Canada
- TD Bank Group
- Toronto Life
- Toronto Metropolitan University
- Toronto Star
- Uber
- UN Women
- UNICEF
- United Nations Democracy Fund (UNDEF)
- United Nations Educational, Scientific and Cultural Organization (UNESCO)
- United Way of Greater Toronto

== Media coverage and partnerships ==
JHR has received media attention in Canada, from The Globe and Mail, The Toronto Star, the Canadian Broadcasting Corporation and CTV.ca. In 2012, JHR partnered with CBC and Global News to send journalists from those networks to JHR projects to act as short-term journalism trainers.

In May 2013, CTV's senior editor and news anchor Lisa LaFlamme mentored a network of JHR affiliated journalists in Goma (Eastern DRC), the centre of ongoing conflict and humanitarian crisis since 1998. In February 2023, LaFlamme returned to Africa to carry out case studies for JHR in Kenya and Tunisia into the impact of the organisation's work in those countries raising awareness of alternative schooling for teen mothers, domestic violence, and sexual harassment in the workplace.

JHR also partners with The Alva Foundation and the University of Toronto's Massey College on the Gordon N. Fisher-JHR Fellowship. The annual fellowship is part of the Southam Journalism Fellowships program at the University of Toronto.

JHR partners with the Canadian Association of Journalism to present an annual award for human rights reporting and an award for an emerging Indigenous journalist. JHR also presents an annual award to a news organization or team for the best human rights coverage in Canada.
