= Sergei A. Losev =

Sergei Andreevich Losev (1927 – 3 October 1988) was a Soviet journalist and politician. From 1979 to 1988 he was general director of TASS, the Soviet Union’s official news agency.

== Life ==
After graduation from the Moscow Institute of International Relations, Losev joined TASS in 1950. He was a correspondent and bureau chief in the United States and Israel. In 1973 he became assistant director of TASS, and in 1979 became the agency's director.

Losev was a member of the Communist Party's Central Auditing Commission, a delegate to the 1981 and 1986 Communist Party congresses, and a delegate to the 1988 Communist Party conference. He had also been a member of the Supreme Soviet of the Soviet Union.

He died in Moscow on 3 October 1988.
