= Herbert Schiller =

American media critic and economist

Herbert I. Schiller
- Born: November 5, 1919; New York City, US
- Died: January 29, 2000 (aged 80); San Diego, California, US
- Occupations: civil servant, academic
- Spouse: Anita Schiller

Academic background
- Education: DeWitt Clinton High School; City College of New York; Columbia University
- Alma mater: New York University
- Thesis: The United States Congress and the American financial contribution to the United Nations Relief and Rehabilitation Administration (1960)
- Doctoral advisor: Kurt F. Flexner

Academic work
- Discipline: Economics; Communication studies
- Institutions: United States Department of Labor (1941–1946); United States Department of War (1946–1948); City College School of Business and Civic Administration (1949–1960?); Pratt Institute (1950–1960?); University of Illinois, Urbana (1960?–1969); University of California, San Diego (1969–1990)
- Main interests: Communication technology Cultural imperialism
- Notable works: Communication and Cultural Domination (1976)
- Notable ideas: packaged consciousness

Herbert Irving Schiller (November 5, 1919 – January 29, 2000) was an American media critic, sociologist, military economist and author. He is known for having established the University of California, San Diego communications programme in 1970 and for having inspired the unsuccessful New World Information and Communication Order project at UNESCO during the late 1970s.

== Biography ==
Schiller was born in New York City as the son of Benjamin, a craftsman jeweler, and Gertrude. He grew up in Washington Heights, Manhattan during the Great Depression, with his father unemployed for a decade, and attended the public DeWitt Clinton High School in the Bronx. He studied social science and economics at the free City College of New York in a cohort with Daniel Bell, Irving Kristol, Melvin J. Lasky and Seymour Martin Lipset, graduating in 1940, and obtained a master's degree in economics from Columbia University in 1941.

In the fall of 1941, he was hired by the Department of Labor in Washington, D.C. and within several months took up a position of a junior industrial economist at the War Production Board, achieving promotion to assistant economist. He was involved in resource allocation and curtailing industrial activities as part of the shift to war economy. During the same period, he joined and became a recruiter for the United Federal Workers of America trade union. He was furloughed and drafted into the United States Army as part of the World War II mobilisation in 1942. From August 1943 until his discharge in the rank of corporal in November 1945, he served as an "information and education specialist clerk typist" outside the combat zone in French North Africa (initially in Algeria and Tunisia, and then for two years in Casablanca in Morocco). After returning to New York, he transferred in March 1946 to the War Department as a labor economist in the Manpower Division of the US Army European Theater of Operations's Office of Military Government in Berlin, on a contract running until the summer of 1948. In Allied-occupied Germany, he observed the limited denazification efforts and is said to have become disillusioned with a business-dominated society.

Schiller returned to the Bronx with his wife in 1948 and enrolled for a PhD in history at Columbia University. He worked as an evening lecturer in economics at the City College School of Business and Civic Administration from 1949. On securing an additional appointment as full-time instructor in economics at the Pratt Institute in Brooklyn in 1950, he transferred to a PhD program in economics at New York University. He was promoted to assistant professor at the Pratt Institute in 1953.

He earned his PhD in 1960 from the New York University Graduate School of Arts and Science with a dissertation on The United States Congress and the American financial contribution to the United Nations Relief and Rehabilitation Administration. He was supervised by the Austrian-born economist Kurt F. Flexner (1915–2006), the chief economist and deputy manager of the American Bankers Association from 1959, who later advised the Soviet president Mikhail Gorbachev and the Russian president Boris Yeltsin from 1990 to 1995.

Schiller then taught economics at the Bureau of Economics and Business Research (Note: Established in 1921 as Bureau of Business Research, among similar units created at large American universities that drew comparisons with business schools and received criticism for their funding links to trade associations.) of the University of Illinois, Urbana, where he took up an interest in the social influence of mass media. In 1969, he joined the University of California, San Diego and established a world-renowned communications programme (along with the Department of Communication) there in 1970.

His 1969 book Mass Communications and the American Empire, which gave an account of the role played by communication technology in Cold War-era American imperialism, provided the main inspiration for the New World Information and Communication Order project, debated at UNESCO from the mid-1970s to 1983. Schiller himself played a leading role in the International Association for Media and Communication Research (IAMCR), launched with the backing of UNESCO in 1957.

Schiller later became a critic of the overall impact of corporate communications on democracy, independent thinking and free speech, dismissing the notion of the Information Age as a misnomer due to the hegemony of consumer culture. He publicly protested the Gulf War in San Diego in 1991 from a liberal position.

Schiller semi-retired from UCSD in 1990. He died in a care center in his home neighbourhood of La Jolla in San Diego, California, in 2000.

== Work and influence ==
Schiller warned of two major trends in his prolific writings and speeches: the private takeover of public space and public institutions at home, and U.S. corporate domination of cultural life abroad, especially in the developing nations. His eight books and hundreds of articles in both scholarly and popular journals made him a key figure both in communication research and in the public debate over the role of the media in modern society. He was widely known for the term "packaged consciousness", that argues American media is controlled by a few corporations that "create, process, refine and preside over the circulation of images and information which determines our beliefs, attitudes and ultimately our behavior". Schiller used Time Warner Inc. as an example of packaged consciousness, stating that it “basically dominates publishing, cable television, recordings, tapes and filmmaking.”

He wrote opinion pieces for The Nation and Le Monde diplomatique, among other titles.

Schiller's colleague Neil Postman credited him with "giving shape and texture to the modern study of communication and culture in America".

Schiller's friend George Gerbner suggested that while Schiller did not embrace Marxism or materialism, had little use for philosophy and never engaged in class analysis, he could still be considered a neo-Marxist concerned with the importance of the cultural superstructure.

== Personal life ==
He married the librarian and scholar Anita R.Schiller (née Rosenbaum), whom he met in New York, in November 1946 in Paris. Among their children, Zach Schiller is a public policy analyst in Ohio, and Dan Schiller is a telecommunications historian at the University of Illinois at Urbana-Champaign. After moving to the West Coast, Schiller was a resident of La Jolla, California, for 30 years.

== Books ==
=== Authored ===
- Mass Communications and American Empire (A.M. Kelley, 1969)
- The Mind Managers (Beacon Press, 1973)
- Communication and Cultural Domination (International Arts and Sciences Press, 1976)
- Who Knows: Information in the Age of the Fortune 500 (Ablex Publishing, 1981)
- Information and the Crisis Economy (Ablex Publishing, 1984; reprinted by Oxford University Press, 1986)
- Culture, Inc.: The Corporate Takeover of Public Expression (Oxford University Press, 1989)
- Hope and Folly: The United States and Unesco, 1945–1985 (with William Preston, Jr. and Edward S. Herman, University of Minnesota Press, 1989)
- The Ideology of International Communications (with Eileen Mahoney, Laurien Alexander, Colleen Roach and Robin Anderson, Institute for Media Analysis, 1992)
- Beyond National Sovereignty: International Communications in the 1990s (with Kaarle Nordenstreng, Ablex Publishing, 1995)
- Information Inequality: The Deepening Social Crisis in America (Routledge, 1996)
- Living in the Number One Country: Reflections from a Critic of American Empire (Seven Stories Press, 2000)

=== Edited ===
- Super-State: Readings in the Military-Industrial Complex (with Joseph D. Phillips, University of Illinois Press, 1970)
- National Sovereignty and International Communication (with Kaarle Nordenstreng, Ablex Publishing, 1979)
- Triumph of the Image: The Media's War in the Persian Gulf: A Global Perspective (with Hamid Mowlana and George Gerbner, Westview Press, 1992)
- Invisible Crises: What Conglomerate Control of Media Means for America and the World (with George Gerbner and Hamid Mowlana, Westview Press, 1996)

== Bibliography ==
- Maxwell, Richard (2003), Herbert Schiller, Critical Media Studies, Lanham, MD: Rowman & Littlefield, ISBN 0-7425-1848-5
