= MacBride report =

1980 report on communication problems in modern societies

Many Voices One World, also known as the MacBride report, was written in 1980 by the United Nations Educational Scientific and Cultural Organization (UNESCO), which reports to its International Commission for the Study of Communication Problems. The MacBride report was named after Irish Nobel laureate and peace and human rights activist, Seán MacBride, and was tasked with analysing communication problems in modern societies, particularly relating to mass media and news, considering the emergence of new technologies, and suggesting a form of communication order (New World Information and Communication Order) to reduce obstacles to further peace and human development.

While the report had strong international support, it was condemned by the United States and the United Kingdom as an attack on the freedom of the press, and both countries withdrew from UNESCO in protest in 1984 and 1985, respectively (and later rejoined in 2003 and 1997, respectively).

== The MacBride Commission ==
The International Commission for the Study of Communication Problems was set up in 1977 by the director of UNESCO Ahmadou-Mahtar M’Bow. The International Commission had over 50 offices around the world. It was agreed that the commission would be chaired by Seán MacBride from Ireland, and the International Commission representatives were selected from 15 other countries. They were invited due to their roles in national and international communication activities and UNESCO picked among media activists, journalists, scholars, and media executives.

The members of the MacBride Commission were:

- Elie Abel (USA)
- Hubert Beuve-Méry (France)
- Elebe Ma Ekonzo (Zaire)
- Gabriel García Márquez (Colombia)
- Sergei Losev (Soviet Union)
- Mochtar Lubis (Indonesia)
- Mustapha Masmoudi (Tunisia)
- Michio Nagai (Japan)
- Fred Isaac Akporuaro Omu (Nigeria)
- Bogdan Osolnik (Yugoslavia)
- Gamal El Oteifi (Egypt)
- Johannes Pieter Pronk (Netherlands)
- Juan Somavía (Chile)
- Boobli George Verghese (India)
- Betty Zimmerman (Canada), in substitution of Marshal McLuhan

== Findings ==
World map representing Human Development Index categories (based on 2021 data, published in 2022): Very high; High; Medium; Low; No data

Among the problems the report identified were concentration of the media, commercialization of the media, and unequal access to information and communication. The commission called for democratization of communication and strengthening of national media to avoid dependence on external sources, among others. Subsequently, Internet-based technologies considered in the work of the commission, served as a means for furthering MacBride's visions.

The MacBride report highlighted that there was a "one-way street" of information. In particular, the MacBride report criticized the visual image that news agencies and mass media nurtured about developing countries in Western countries, which enjoyed a high degree of industrialization. The MacBride report lamented that the quality of "communicative content" had started to guide the academy in the scientific discourse.

The commission presented a preliminary report in October 1978 at the 20th General Conference of UNESCO in Paris. The commission's seminal session on new technologies to address the identified problems, was hosted by India at New Delhi in March 1979. The final report was delivered to M’Bow in April 1980 and was approved by consensus in the 21st General Conference of UNESCO in Belgrade. The commission dissolved after presenting the report.

== Reaction by UN member states ==
Because of controversy surrounding the report and the withdrawal of support by the UNESCO leadership in the 1980s for its ideas, the book went out of print and was difficult to obtain. A book on the history of the United States and UNESCO was even threatened with legal action and forced to include a disclaimer that UNESCO was in no way involved with it. The MacBride report was eventually reprinted by Rowman and Littlefield in the US, and is also freely available online.

The report had strong international support. However, it was condemned by the United States and the United Kingdom as an attack on the freedom of the press.

== Impact in the long run ==
In the 1970s and 1980s, major changes in media and communication were enacted thanks to the MacBride report. They promoted policies directed at the liberalization of the telecommunication market. The monopoly powers as well as the comparative advantage, or dominance, of radio and television broadcasters, as well as newspaper companies.

== See also ==
- International communication
- Global news flow
