= Media development =

Process of building capacity for media

Media development involves capacity building for institutions or individuals related to freedom of expression, pluralism and diversity of media, as well as transparency of media ownership. Media development plays a role in democracy and effective democratic discourse through supporting free and independent media.

== Support ==
International donors and other organizations often include support for media development as part of their overall support to international economic and democratic development. Typical efforts to develop independent media development include: journalist training and education; support for and advice on improving the legal and business environment for media; efforts to improve the sustainability of existing outlets; media literacy training; digital media training and integration; infrastructure development; monitoring and evaluation efforts, and supporting the transition of state media to public service media with editorial independence.

== Indicators ==
=== UNESCO Media Development Indicators ===
UNESCO developed Media Development Indicators in 2008 as a framework for international media development.

Indicators are within five categories:

- A system of regulation conducive to freedom of expression, pluralism and diversity of the media
- Plurality and diversity of media, a level economic playing field and transparency of ownership
- Media as a platform for democratic discourse
- Professional capacity building and supporting institutions that underpins freedom of expression, pluralism and diversity
- Infrastructural capacity is sufficient to support independent and pluralistic media

The indicators were used for a pilot international survey in 2011 in which 28 countries participated, focused on regulation and supply.

=== Media Sustainability Index ===
The International Research and Exchanges Board’s (IREX) Media Sustainability Index (MSI) is another widely used tool to evaluate the global development of independent media. The MSI is one of the most important indices "to assess how media systems change over time and across borders."

The MSI uses five fundamental objectives to assess to what extent a media system is independent, sustainable and successful. The five objectives are:

- "Legal and social norms protect and promote free speech and access to public information.
- Journalism meets professional standards of quality.
- Multiple news sources provide citizens with reliable, objective news.
- Media are well-managed enterprises, allowing editorial independence.
- Supporting institutions function in the professional interests of independent media".

== Media development vs. media for development ==
Some development organizations and experts make a distinction between media development and media for development. Support for "Media development" refers to efforts to directly improve the media in a society (through the means mentioned above). "Media for development" refers to using existing media to convey messages about specific development issues. Such efforts include many ICT for Development (ICT4D) projects. Media for Development has been applied to education, healthcare, business, disaster relief, corruption, minority empowerment, and local community engagement, among other development goals.

== Organizations ==
While development of the media sector is a common activity of many development organizations, there are a small number that engage in direct media development as their primary purpose.

=== International groups involved in media development ===
==== BBC Media Action ====
The BBC Media Action is a British implementer that does direct media development work. Earlier known as the BBC World Service Trust, it is active in over 40 countries and on every continent. While all its programs are media development-oriented, they focus on Emergency response, Health, Governance and human rights, Education, Environment, and Livelihoods.

The Trust is funded by external grants and voluntary contributions, mainly from the UK's Department for International Development (DFID), the European Union, UN agencies, and charitable foundations. They also receive a small amount of core support from the BBC (both in kind and cash).

==== DW Akademie - Deutsche Welle ====
DW Akademie is Deutsche Welle's international center for media development, media consulting and journalism training based in Bonn and Berlin. It offers training and consulting projects.

Since 1965 DW Akademie has been conducting a variety of media development projects to reinforce free and independent media, particularly in developing and transition countries. In Africa, Asia, Latin America, the Middle East, Europe and Central Asia, DW Akademie engages in long-term partnerships with local broadcasters and media institutions.

DW Akademie's work is financed through public funding provided mainly by the German Ministry for Economic Cooperation and Development, the German Foreign Ministry and the European Union.

Reporters Without Borders

RSF monitors press freedom violations and releases an annual Press Freedom Index that ranks countries based on their score, with a higher number indicating more press freedom violations.

==== Internews Europe ====
Internews Europe is an international development organisation that specialises in supporting independent media and free information flows in fragile states, emerging democracies and some of the world's poorest countries.

==== Thomson Foundation ====
The Thomson Foundation is an international training and development organisation. Since 1962, it has been helping raise the standards of journalism worldwide through training, consultancy and strategic advice. It seeks to ensure that all people have an honest, factual account of what is happening in the world through improving journalism and communication. Its online learning platform has capacity to produce training courses in multiple languages. The foundation is based in London.

==== DFID ====
The Department for International Development is the British government's main foreign aid agency. It is a significant funder of media development around the world. Similar to USAID (see above), media development is often a secondary goal within larger projects.

==== Journalists for Human Rights ====
Journalists for Human Rights (JHR) is an international media development non-governmental organization whose goal is "to make everyone in the world fully aware of their rights".

As Canada's largest media development organization, jhr has offices in Toronto, Canada (Head Office); Freetown, Sierra Leone; Kinshasa, Democratic Republic of Congo; and Monrovia, Liberia. It also has representatives and non-profit status in the United States and the United Kingdom and operations in Ghana and Malawi.

jhr focuses its programming and efforts on strengthening the local media in countries with some level of freedom in the press, training local journalists on improving their human rights reporting skills. The organization is a pioneer in Rights Media, a new category of media development that has been defined as the “process of writing, collecting, editing, producing and distributing media that creates societal dialogue on human rights issues”. The only NGO in the world focused exclusively on human rights reporting, jhr's work in Rights Media aims to bridge the contentious divide between two camps in the sector: traditional 'media development' proponents and 'communication for development' practitioners. The former of the two focuses on developing infrastructure and professional capacity of media professionals and outlets. The latter focuses on getting particular messages into the public domain through the media. Rights Media does both — it focuses on building capacity of local media outlets to effectively get messages to the general public.

=== Multilateral organizations involved in media development ===
==== UNDP ====
Media development is only a part of the focus of the United Nations Development Program. UNDP has developed a list of Millennium Development Goals, none of which directly mention media, yet media factor into each of the goals.

==== UNESCO ====
The United Nations Educational, Scientific and Cultural Organization funds some media development programs. Specifically, the Communication and Information Sector is responsible for a number of media-related programs. The International Programme for the Development of Communication (IPDC) funds dozens of media development projects throughout the world each year and in 2008 launched the Media Development Indicators, a framework that assesses how the media can best contribute to, and benefit from, good governance and democratic development based on five categories assessing the media ecology of a given country.

==== The World Bank Institute ====
The World Bank Institute (WBI) is the capacity development branch of the World Bank. It provides learning programs, policy advice and technical assistance to policy makers, government and non-government agencies and development practitioners of developing countries.

The Communications for Governance and Accountability Program (CommGAP), was a global program at the World Bank that promoted the use of communication in governance reform programs and supported the building of democratic public spheres. CommGAP was dissolved in October, 2011.

=== Other international groups ===
==== GFMD ====
The Global Forum for Media Development (GFMD) is an international network of over 200 journalism support and media development organisations working across more than 70 countries. Established in 2015 and based in Brussels, Belgium.

==== Salzburg Global Seminar ====
The Salzburg Global Seminar (formerly the Salzburg Seminar) organises discussions among high-level people on particular topics.

=== National groups: Bangladesh ===
Bangladesh NGOs Network for Radio and Communication (BNNRC) is in Special Consultative Status with the Economic and Social Council (ECOSOC) accredited with World Summit on the Information Society (WSIS) of the United Nations and UN WSIS prize winner 2016 and Champion 2017. BNNRC's outreach extends to local, national and international forums for communicating Knowledge for Media.

BNNRC's approach to media development is both knowledge-driven and context-sensitive, and it takes into account the challenges and opportunities created by the rapidly changing media environment in Bangladesh including community radio development giving voices for the voiceless.

BNNRC is actively working to improve recognition of the community electronic media sector (Community Radio, Community TV, Community Film) & its work in and involvement with the communities. BNNRC represent the community electronic media sector to Government, Industry, Regulatory Bodies, Media, Academia and Development Partners from 2000.

BNNRC promote the community electronic media sector to Government, Industry, Regulatory Bodies, Media, Academia and Development Partners. It provides leadership and support for rural initiators to facilitate independent electronic community broadcasting services, to build and strengthen rural communities in line with their hopes and dreams & initiated a process to explore the future of development cooperation and the role of electronic community media over the next 15 years in line with Sustainable Development Goal (SDG).

=== Other international organizations ===
International News Safety Institute—INSI is a nonprofit dedicated to improving the safety of journalists worldwide. Based in Brussels, it is somewhat like a European version of CPJ, though it also has an office in New York. INSI also provides resources to improve journalist safety and does training in the field.

International Federation of Journalists—IFJ is a network of journalist organizations from around the world, based in Belgium.

The Communication Initiative—The CI is a large network of people and organizations interested in communications for development and (less so) media development. The site is also a data dump for a number of articles and other resources on topics in communications for development.

Panos—The Panos Network is a communication for development organization with autonomous “institutes” around the world. "Panos works with [journalists,] media and other information actors to enable developing countries to shape and communicate their own development agendas through informed public debate."

Article 19—Article XIX is “a human rights organization with a specific mandate and focus on the defense and promotion of freedom of expression and freedom of information worldwide.” In addition to advocacy, it produces reports on topics relevant to press freedom.

IFEX—The International Freedom of Expression eXchange is primarily an advocacy organization. IFEX is one of the best sources of news about media, journalists, and freedom of expression in countries around the world through its twice-weekly IFEX Digest.

=== United States-based groups involved in direct media development ===
==== Institute for War and Peace Reporting ====
The Institute for War and Peace Reporting is an international media development charity, established in 1991. IWPR supports local reporters, citizen journalists and civil society activists in countries in conflict, crisis and transition around the world. It trains, mentors and provides platforms for professional and citizen reporters; builds up the institutional capacity of media and civic groups; and works with partners to remove barriers to free expression, robust public debate and citizen engagement. IWPR operates major programmes in Afghanistan, the Caucasus, Central Asia, Iraq, the Balkans, Congo DRC, Tunisia and Uganda.

==== Internews ====
Internews is an international media development organization whose mission is to empower local media worldwide to give people the news and information they need, the ability to connect, and the means to make their voices heard.

Internews has worked in over 70 countries and trained over 80,000 people in media skills. Together with local partners, Internews activities include establishing and supporting media outlets, journalist associations, and broadcast networks. Internews also has special programs to improve reporting on the environment, humanitarian crises, public health and women's issues.

Formed in 1982, Internews Network is a 501(c)(3) organization headquartered in California. The organization currently works in Africa, Asia, Europe, the Middle East, and North America.

==== ICFJ ====
The International Center for Journalists is a non-profit, professional organization located in Washington, D.C., that promotes quality journalism worldwide in the belief that independent, vigorous media are crucial in improving the human condition. Since 1984, the International Center for Journalists has worked directly with more than 55,000 journalists from 176 countries. Aiming to raise the standards of journalism, ICFJ offers hands-on training, workshops, seminars, fellowships and international exchanges to reporters and media managers around the globe.

ICFJ operates the Knight International Journalism Fellowships program, which sends media professionals from around the world to developing nations to improve the media there.

ICFJ also operates the International Journalists’ Network (IJNet), which serves as an online resource for journalists around the world to communicate with one another and improve their own journalism standards and practices.

==== IREX ====
International Research & Exchanges Board (IREX) is an international nonprofit organization providing leadership and innovative programs to improve the quality of education, strengthen independent media, and foster pluralistic civil society development. IREX designs education programs and provides consulting that support lifelong learning. Programs focus on primary and secondary levels, through higher education, and continuing into professional training.

IREX also publishes the Media Sustainability Index (MSI), which provides in-depth analyses of the conditions for independent media in 76 countries across Africa, Europe, Eurasia, and the Middle East.

==== Media Development Investment Fund ====
Media Development Investment Fund (MDIF), formerly Media Development Loan Fund, is a New York-registered 501(c)(3) nonprofit corporation and mission-driven investment fund that provides low-cost financing to independent news outlets in countries with a history of media oppression. Through low-cost capital (mainly loans), business training and other advice and support, it aims to help news outlets committed to responsible journalism become commercially sustainable, believing that only financially independent news media can stay editorially independent over the long term.

In 1998 MDIF also founded CAMP (Centre for Advanced Media-Prague) which provided technology support to independent media in developing countries. In 2010, MDIF spun off CAMP as an independent organization, Sourcefabric, whose mission is to provide independent media outlets with the open source software, tools and support they need to produce the news. In 2013 Media Development Loan Fund changed its name to Media Development Investment Fund.

=== American government organizations involved in media development ===
The U.S. government provides about half of American funding of media development abroad.

==== USAID ====
The U.S. Agency for International Development is the largest single U.S. funder, public or private, of independent media abroad. It spent $52.7 million in 2006 on international media sector development—about 37 percent of American funding, according to a study by the Center for International Media Assistance.

USAID's Office of Democracy and Governance (DCHA/DG) manages roughly $500,000 annually for media-related work. The bureau has two full-time media experts on staff who are consulted on media projects around the world.

USAID's Office of Transition Initiatives (OTI), which was created in 1994 to provide a quick response mechanism in times of crisis, including post-war situations, spent $3 million on international media sector development in 2006.

The Europe and Eurasia Bureau (E&E) currently manages $130,000 annually to support publication of the Europe and Eurasia Media Sustainability Index, but its influence extends well beyond that amount. E&E's media advisor works with mission offices in the region, where most funding decisions are made, on how best to allocate resources for media work.

==== U.S. State Department ====
The State Department’s largest single funder of independent media sector development is its Bureau of Democracy, Human Rights, and Labor (DRL), which spent $11.8 million on the sector in 2006. U.S. embassies, through ambassadors’ funds and other sources, also provide considerable funding of local media projects. Other State Department bureaus, such as the Bureau of Population, Refugees, and Migration, also support international media work.

The Middle East Partnership Initiative (MEPI), which was created in 2002 to promote democracy in the Middle East, included approximately $3 million to support independent media in 2006.

==== BBG ====
The Broadcasting Board of Governors is responsible for all U.S. government-sponsored, nonmilitary broadcasting for international audiences. This includes the Voice of America, Alhurra, Radio Sawa, Radio Free Europe/Radio Liberty, Radio Free Asia, and Radio and TV Martí. BBG's total budget for fiscal year 2006 was $645 million, of which $1.5 million went to the training of international journalists, according to the CIMA survey.

==== MCC ====
The Millennium Challenge Corporation, founded in 2004, is a government corporation tasked with assisting some of the world's poorest countries. Dollar amounts are tied to countries’ progress on several key indicators, including improved press freedom. MCC has incorporated media development in at least five of the countries: Malawi, Moldova, Niger, Tanzania, and Ukraine.

=== Other United States-based groups ===
==== The Center for International Media Assistance (CIMA) ====
The Center for International Media Assistance (CIMA) is an initiative of the National Endowment for Democracy (NED). CIMA works to improve the development of independent media worldwide while working to strengthen the support for such development. The center works to improve the effectiveness of existing media development efforts by conducting research and bringing together a broad range of experts to share their experiences. CIMA's mission is based on the conviction that free and independent media play an indispensable role in developing sustainable democracies around the world.

==== Knight Foundation ====
The John S. and James L. Knight Foundation is one of the largest funders of direct media assistance in the U.S. It is also responsible for helping fund and launch some programs in media development, including the Knight News Challenge.

Knight also funds the Knight International Journalism Fellowships (along with the Gates Foundation).

==== OSF ====
Open Society Foundations (formerly known as the Open Society Institute, OSI) is a network of foundations founded by billionaire George Soros. While it once operated primarily in Eastern Europe, it now has programs worldwide. Though OSF is the largest private funder of media development, media is only a part of OSF's activities, particularly in the following programs: Information Program, Media Program, and Open Society Justice Initiative.

=== Other U.S. funders of media assistance ===
There are a number of foundations and other organizations in the U.S. that are responsible for a significant amount of media assistance funding, yet without a program engaged in direct “media development.” These projects are often called “communications for development” and are a very common form of media development.

==== The National Endowment for Democracy (NED) ====
The National Endowment for Democracy (NED) is a U.S. non-profit soft power organization that was founded in 1983 to promote democracy. It is funded primarily through an annual allocation from the U.S. Congress, within the budget of USAID, the U.S. agency for development assistance, which is part of the U.S. State Department. Although administered as a private organization, its funding mostly comes from a governmental appropriation by Congress but was created by The Democracy Program as a bipartisan, private, non-profit corporation. In addition to its grants program, NED also supports and houses the Journal of Democracy, the World Movement for Democracy, the International Forum for Democratic Studies, the Reagan–Fascell Fellowship Program, the Network of Democracy Research Institutes, and the Center for International Media Assistance.

==== Freedom House ====
Freedom House does two major surveys every year – Freedom in the World, and Freedom of the Press. Along with IREX's MSI and Reporters Without Borders’ Press Freedom Index, this is one of the essential indexes of press freedom worldwide. Unlike the MSI, it covers every country in the world, but does not do so in depth (though still provides a brief analysis of each country).

==== USIP ====
The U.S. Institute of Peace is funded by the government much like NED is. However, its board is appointed by Congress, so they lack the independence that NED has. USIP's media programming is part of its larger goal to promote peace worldwide.

==== Search for Common Ground ====
Search for Common Ground does some journalism training as well as producing material for radio and TV stations in various locations around the world. Their media arm is called Common Ground Productions.

==== Other advocacy organizations ====
Committee to Protect Journalists—CPJ is a nonprofit that “defends the rights of journalists to report the news without fear of reprisal.” It also keeps track of journalists injured or killed worldwide.

The Dart Center for Journalists & Trauma—based at the University of Washington, Dart does workshops on journalist safety.

The Poynter Institute—Poynter trains journalists online and on site at its St. Petersburg, Florida campus.

Investigative Reporters and Editors—IRE, based at the University of Missouri, is the world's oldest and largest association of investigative journalists and it trains several thousand journalists each year.

The International Women's Media Foundation—IWMF is a global network of women journalists that runs leadership and training seminars in 22 countries.

==== Academic programs ====
There are a number of academic programs at universities around the country that do work on media development issues or engage in media development of their own.

George Washington University’s School of Media and Public Affairs (SMPA)

Johns Hopkins University’s School of Advanced International Studies (SAIS) runs an International Reporting Project that works with U.S. journalists to encourage more international reporting

Harvard University’s Joan Shorenstein Center on the Press, Politics and Public Policy often publishes reports on relevant topics in media assistance

The Nieman Foundation (also at Harvard) runs a fellowship program for journalists (both U.S. and international) to come learn at Harvard

Stanford University runs a similar fellowship program called the John S. Knight Fellowships for Professional Journalists
