= Comparative election campaign communication research =

Research regarding election campaign

Comparative election campaign communication research examines how and with what effect election campaigns are conducted in a temporal or spatial comparative approach. Therefore, it focuses on three interrelated dimensions: politics, media and electorate. Spatial comparative election communication research investigates campaign practices, its media responses and its effects on the electorate in different countries.

== History ==
The development of election campaign communication can be divided in three phases, a traditional, party-centered period after World War II, a media-centered, personalizing and professionalizing modern period from the 1960s to the 1980s and a still emerging postmodern phase or period of political marketing, characterized by marketing-logics, fragmentation of voter groups, negativity and new media channels.

Comparative campaign communication research emerged in the period of modern campaigning in the 1970s, when research revealed similar trends in campaigning in Western democracies. One of the first European studies in this field by media and communication theorist Jay Blumler and his colleagues examined the effect of television campaigning on electorate and their interest in the election by comparing the 1974 election campaigns in UK, France and Belgium. The question of how the media affect the electorate was of great interest in European research of that time, while U.S. American scholars focused on how election campaigns were conducted and orientated towards mass media. A number of political journalists and scholars such as Theodore W. White, Joe Mc Giddens, and Joe Napolitan analyzed strategies of presidential campaigning in the U.S. during the 1960s and 1970s.

When campaigning style internationally processed towards marketing driven practices in the 1980s and 1990s, research followed with increasing interest and establishment of international approaches. In a widely acknowledged study the political scientists David L. Swanson and Paolo Mancini in 1996 compared 11 democracies with regard to the Americanization hypothesis and examined the consequences of modernization for politics, media and their interrelations. Their study revealed international common patterns in media centered campaigning. Swanson and Mancini established the Americanization hypothesis as a yardstick for research and emphasized the explanatory value of modernization for comparative research.

== Theoretical approaches ==
Some of the most common theoretical approaches of international comparative studies in election campaign communication research are:

=== Modernization ===
The theoretical assumption of modernization derives similar developments or convergence of campaign communication practices in Western democracies, present e.g. in the political systems of United States and UK, from professionalization of society. Professionalization is therefore assessed as a consequence of differentiation in modern societies in general, which affects organization, management and style of political campaigning as well as the multiplicity of media and the fragmentation of voter groups.

=== Americanization ===
The term Americanization relates these processes to a U.S. American starting point from which other Western democratic societies adapted successful U.S. American strategies of campaigning as most advanced practices. Characteristics of Americanized electoral campaigning are e.g., professionalization, that is the engagement of political consultants, media- and television centered as well as negative campaigning and personalization, e.g., campaigns focusing on individual candidates instead of the candidates' parties.

=== Media dependency theory ===
This model serves political election campaign research "where the relationship between mass media and the electors and candidates remains a central focus." According to media dependency theory "the extent of media effects is related to the degree of dependence of individuals and societal systems on media." Following this approach, differences and consistencies in campaigning practices are consequences of common or diverse interdependencies between media, politics and individuals. If, e.g., people's needs are satisfied to the same extent and in the same way by media in two countries, media dependency theory expects these countries' media to have a similar impact on people's voting decision.

=== Hybridization ===
"Hybridization means a country-specific supplementation of traditional campaign practices with select features of the media driven, post-modern style of campaigning." According to hybridization theory as subconcept of modernization global, i.e. macro-level, campaigning trends supplement country-specific campaign practices, i.e. on the micro-level, considering particularities in political culture. Examples of post-modern campaign practices are increasing negativity of campaigns, virtual campaigning via online media or television debates of single party leaders. When, e.g., negativity in campaigning is observable but limited by national law, this can be an indication for hybridization.

The theories of modernization and Americanization were debated controversially especially in the 1970s and 1980s. Americanization hypothesis has suffered a lot of criticism for not considering national differences in political structures and media systems, in particular diverse voting systems and campaigning restrictions. Modernization and professionalization are regarded as more adequate theoretical approaches, as their assumption of a general international trend in campaigning is not contradictory to national particularities. Today Americanization serves as a yardstick, while context-sensitive approaches like media dependency theory, modernization and hybridization are widely established.

== State of the art ==
Americanization is still a point of reference for comparative election campaign communication research under the assumption of modernization processes. The field of election campaign communication is examined by a number of disciplines, e.g. political science, sociology as well as social psychology, media and communication sciences and economics. As a consequence different perspectives on political election campaign communication, e.g., political marketing, digital campaigning or political public relations, emerge. To the multiplicity and fragmentation of the field of study in theoretical and methodological approaches, media and communications scientists Jesper Strömbäck and political communication scholar Frank Esser tried to define a comprehensive framework of comparative election campaign communication research in 2012. They developed an approach that relates contextual variables to different models of election campaigning and show their empirically observable attributes. According to them, research on different types of campaigning should be accompanied by a context variable considering political systems, e.g., a presidential or parliamentary political system, and a context variable referring to media systems, e.g. multichannel or narrow-range mediascapes. As empirically observable attributes of campaign organization and electorate, such as organizational resources, like online activism and party membership, and characteristics of mass media, such as news coverage, should be examined.

== Findings ==
In international comparative research on campaign practices the study by political scientists Gunda and Fritz Plasser revealed a hybridization of global campaign practices and local political culture in 19 countries in 2002. With regard to international comparative research on election news coverage, e.g. Jesper Strömbäck and Toril Aalberg in 2008 explained diversities in similar countries like Sweden and Norway by different framing concepts, media bias as well as cultural and structural variations. Differences in political news culture were first examined in 2008 by Frank Esser who developed a typology of political television news culture by a cross-analysis of sound bite and image bite news in France, Germany, UK, and the U.S.. Regarding the extent of journalistic or editorial influence an interventionist U.S. American approach, a moderately interventionist Anglo-German approach, and a noninterventionist French approach were identified. A market-orientation of political campaigning addressing voters as consumers of a political product was revealed by political scientist David M. Farrell in 2002. Lynda L. Kaid and Christina Holtz-Bacha examined political TV advertising in 12 countries in 2006. By, e.g., an analysis of structural country-specific TV campaigning restrictions and a content analysis of the TV adverts, the two communications scientists identified transnational campaigning trends such as the emphasis of political issues and the disregard of party issues.

== Methods ==
For detailed information about methods of comparative election campaign communication research see Research strategies of election campaign communication research.

=== Scope of research ===
Comparative election campaign communication research strives for spatial and temporal analyses.

- Spatial comparison focuses internationally on most different outcomes in most similar political systems, e.g. election campaigning news coverage in democratic corporatist countries like Sweden and Denmark. Furthermore, comparative analysis can examine similar outcomes in most different political systems by investigating e.g. in effects of promotional activity and different electoral systems on voter turnout in British and German EU elections. - Temporal comparison analyses single-country specific differences and similarities in diverse periods of time.

=== Research instruments ===
Depending on the object of analysis, network research, e.g. interviews with consultants to analyze professional networks, survey research, e.g. opinion polls or marketing surveys, content analysis, e.g. of news coverage, and experimental research can be chosen as research instruments.

=== Sampling ===
Comparative analysis examines the usage and effects of different media channels that are employed by political campaign communication, while corresponding types of media technology are considered as objects of analysis as well. These channels can be divided in two groups:

1. Party controlled channels, e.g. partisan press and TV spots.

2. Party uncontrolled channels, e.g. independent news outlets.

Besides media conditions, actors in election campaigning e.g., political consultants, politicians or voters are taken into account for an analysis of practices and effects of campaign communication.

=== Validity ===
Regarding in particular the validity of international and intercultural comparative approaches, research methods are required to deliver adequate culture-specific measurements of observed phenomena and practices to consider different cultural contexts.

== Criticism and limitations ==
Election campaign communication research suffers criticism for lacking interdisciplinary exchange, e.g. between political science, psycho-sociology and media and communications science. Another reproach is being made for a too Western-centered scope of research, e.g., disregarding campaigning practices in African or Asian nations. Related to this, methods of international comparison are criticized for an insufficient consideration of country-specific political cultures, norms and language-barriers.

In accordance, limitations of international research methods lie in the coordination of different national theoretical approaches and diverse ways to interpret the found results in an international team of researchers. As a consequence of cultural differences, language barriers and limited financial resources, research is often bound to Western regions, which partly explains the Western-centered scope.

== See also ==
- Americanization in Election Campaign Communication
- Hybridization in political election campaign communication
- Research strategies of election campaign communication research
- Political communication
- Political campaign
- Political culture
- Political consulting
- Comparative politics
