= Mediated cross-border communication =

Mediated cross-border communication is a scholarly field in communication studies and refers to any mediated form of communication in the course of which nation state or cultural borders are crossed or even get transgressed and undermined (e.g., world news, satellite television, transnational media events).

The expression serves as an umbrella term that encompasses different research approaches (e.g., international communication, transnational communication) that can heuristically be differentiated by their specific use of research perspectives, as well as particular levels and objects of analysis (see dimensions of analysis).

Thematically, research is often concerned with the political dimension of mediated cross-border communication. Examples include studies on the impact of mediated cross-border communication on foreign policy (CNN effect,) political change (media and democratization, zapatista effect, boomerang effect,) research on official government communication targeting foreign audiences (e.g., certain kinds of International broadcasting, Public diplomacy) and questions on media representations of the developing world (e.g., New World Information and Communication Order). Apart from that, global mass communication ethics and the globalization of entertainment constitute further important topics. An at least implicit common feature to almost all of the aforementioned topics is their general interest in answering the question to what extent nationally, culturally or otherwise defined media systems influence each other, converge or whether they can pertain distinct identities under conditions of mediated cross-border communication.

Mediated cross-border communication is considered as becoming increasingly important both as a real world phenomenon and field of research as there has been a steady strengthening of the conditions of globalization and media innovations that offer fast and low-cost forms of cross-border communication since the second half of the twentieth century. However, critics argue that the importance of the nation state remains high; for example, most online communication still takes place between citizens of the same nation state. Also, the responsibility for most broadcasting and press legislation usually rests with individual national states.

== History of research ==
The history of mediated cross-border communication research is closely related to the three major decades of the 20th century, which stimulated and influenced this field of research in terms of themes, funding sources as well as ideologies: The two world wars in the first half of the 20th century, the Cold War decade, and finally the era of globalization after the collapse of communism in Eastern Europe in 1989 and the former Soviet Union in 1991. Throughout the time, technological innovations such as satellite television or the Internet and the expansion of media markets across national borders have further stimulated research interest in mediated cross-border communication.

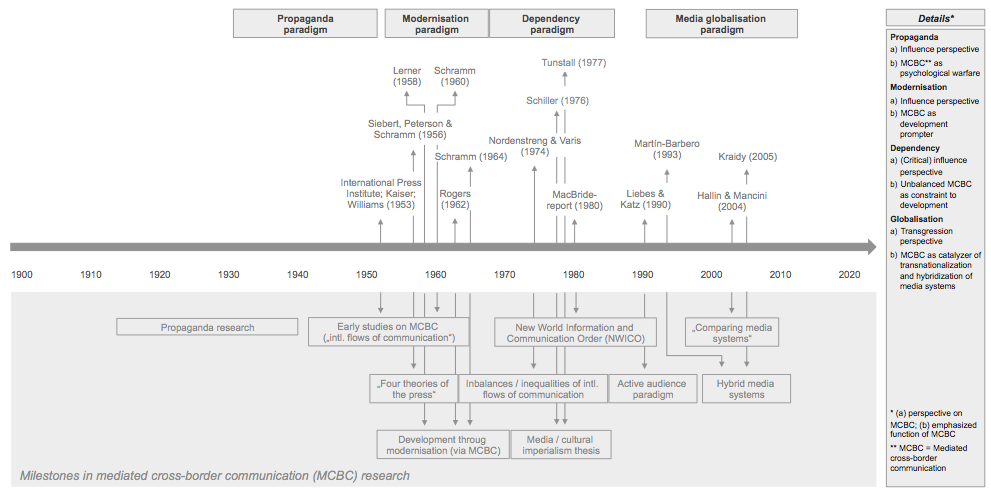

=== 1930–1950: As psychological warfare (propaganda paradigm) ===
The propaganda operations of the great powers in the twentieth century's two world wars are often considered to have been the initiating driving forces for sustained scholarly interest into mediated cross-border research. Although cross-border communication activities have been set in place by national governments since ancient history, it was not until the early twentieth century that such international propaganda efforts were followed by systematic academic research. Literature reviews show that this trend continued far into the aftermath of World War II until development and modernization became leading research themes in the 1960s

=== 1950–1970: As development prompter (modernization paradigm) ===
In the 1950s, studies on mediated cross-border communication started to increasingly stress its assumed function as development and modernization prompter (development communication), not least due to the dozens of countries in Asia, Africa, and South America who gained their political independence at that time. US government interests to "modernize" these countries paralleled with sustained research efforts regarding the role of (mediated cross-border) mass media in this context. At that time, the latter was predominantly conceptualized as one-way flow of communication from government development agencies to people in Third World nations. Typically, strong media effects were assumed that would change attitudes and behavior of individuals, thus supporting the modernization of countries

Important proponents of the modernism paradigm later admitted its limitations and shortcomings, especially with regard to the application of the Western model of development to Third World countries. The reduction of development and modernization to economic growth (poverty as equivalent to underdevelopment), overestimation of strong media effects and the ethnocentric promotion of adopting a Western model of society are today commonly viewed as the central reasons why modernization theory was subverted by early 1970.

The 1950s also showed early studies of international news flows, with assumingly the first one conducted by the International Press Institute in 1953, which was followed by more systematic analyses in the early 1960s by Wilbur Schramm (1960), thus initiating research concerned with the "balance" of news exchanges between developed and developing nations (Hur, 1984, p. 365). Furthermore, the then newly established UNESCO started to function as an important funding source and research agenda setter, sponsoring field-related studies on foreign news coverage and international news flows (for early examples see Kaiser, 1953; Williams, 1953).

Another landmark study in this phase of research was the “Four theories of the press” put forward by Siebert, Peterson and Schramm (1956), which offered a framework for comparative media system research. With regard to varying degrees of state interventionism, the authors described four ideal types of how media were ought to be organized (authoritarian, libertarian, Soviet communism, and social responsibility). Despite the fact that the book received widespread scholarly attention, it is today commonly criticized for its ideological bias, lack of empirical concern and universal approach.

=== 1970–1990: As media imperialism (dependency paradigm) ===
Between the 1970s and early 1980s, research was characterized by an unprecedented amount of critical assessments of news and entertainment flows between developed and developing nations, framed by dependency theories and notions of media imperialism (see also cultural imperialism). Proponents of the latter criticized the dominance of Western mass media in the evolving global media market as being a threat to the cultural identity of developing nations Indeed, empirical studies on international information flows found an "unbalanced one-way traffic" (Nordenstreng & Varis, 1974) from big exporting countries to the rest of the world.

Again, UNESCO played an important role in this context that is shown by guest contributions from top representatives to major scholarly journals, its function as funding source for international comparative research projects, and especially through the publication of the so-called MacBride report, which synthesized the controversial debate on imbalances and inequalities in international flows of communication that by then was coined by the term "New World Information and Communication Order (NWICO)". The report was echoed by extensive academic attention ranging from hailing the report's call for a democratization of mediated cross-border communication to criticizing it for its alleged technological determinism and led to a dramatic growth of empirical studies in this field in the beginning 1980s However, most inquiries remained rather descriptive with additional normative considerations, whereas explanatory approaches were largely missing. For instance, Hur reported after a review of 80 studies from 1970 to 1982, that key questions such as whether international news flow or coverage is influenced by news events themselves or relationships between nations, or by the media involved remained largely unexplained.

After the collapse of communism in Eastern Europe in 1989 and the former Soviet Union in 1991, dependency theory and the media imperialism thesis became largely abandoned from research agenda, to be replaced by concepts of media globalisation and perspectives of transnational communication. While some say this happened in tune with the neo-liberal climate of the time, the passing of the then prevailing paradigm is also to be attributed to its inability to explain forms of hybrid media systems as it rather focused on the quantitative supply as opposed to the particular use of media contents (for details see section on Media imperialism: the evolution of an influence perspective). Thus, scholars argued that the plain notion of Western domination failed to account for the complex and multidirectional nature of mediated cross-border communication Yet, the paradigm's inherent influence perspective and other central questions of the debate keep re-emerging under different headings and more advanced concepts such as hybridization and glocalisation.

=== 1990–today: As transnationalization and hybridization of national public spheres (globalization paradigm) ===
From the 1990s on, another shift of paradigm took place with the emergence of globalization as the new key term of the field. Whereas previous decades of research for most of the part followed an influence perspective, the 1990s and especially from 2000 on saw a rise of transnational approaches that applied transgression perspective on mediated cross-border communication. According to Hafez, two different types of globalization theorems can be differentiated, which are coined by the terms of conversion and domestication. The idea of conversion is represented in works such as McLuhan's “global village”-approach, that expects the emergence of a global consciousness. The second type is coined by the term of glocalisation.

A third major stimulus to the field of study was set into place in 2004 with the publication of “Comparing media systems” (see Comparing Media Systems: Three Models of Media and Politics. Unlike the “Four theories of the press”, an emphasis was put on the synthesis of empirical findings. Furthermore, the authors tried to avoid the universal approach put forward by Siebert et al., focusing themselves on North America and Western Europe countries. The work has been stimulating a great number of subsequent studies that try to adopt and modify the models and analytical dimensions (e.g., Political parallelism) of “Comparing media systems” to other parts of the world.

== Dimensions of analysis ==
Research approaches to mediated cross-border communication can be categorized with regard to the respective dimensions of analysis. Wessler and Brüggemann propose three dimensions of analysis: (1) research perspectives, (2) levels of analysis and (3) objects of analysis. Most entities discussed below are considered to be convergent by nature, thus being open for combination and parallel use.

=== Research perspectives ===
Three different research perspectives are commonly applied to the field of mediated cross-border communication

1. the “comparative perspective”
2. the “influence perspective”
3. the “transgression perspective”

As a “meta-method”, the comparative perspective is common to the vast majority of studies in this academic field and can be combined with all subsequent methods, perspectives, levels and objects of analysis.

(1) The “comparative perspective” (Comparative research) seeks for similarities and differences as well as processes of convergence and divergence (see transformation processes of media systems) between different entities such as national media systems or organizations.

With regard to research goals, two basic comparative research designs can be differentiated. The “Most different systems, similar outcome design” aims to compare heterogeneous media systems to identify general statements which are (relatively) invariant concerning the systems within which observations are made (e.g., in a survey of journalists from seventeen explicitly different countries, Hanitzsch et al. extracted relatively invariant cross-national structures of perceived influences on journalism). By contrast, the “Most similar system, different outcome design” stresses the individual causes of observed differences between a given number of media systems. The rationale behind this second approach is that causes of intercultural or international differences are thought to be easier to interpret when the cases under study share many similarities (e.g., Hallin and Mancini said that one of the main reasons for focusing on Western media systems in their seminal work from 2004 was to reduce the number and complexity of variables).

Type	Cases under study	Research objectives
Most different systems, similar outcome	Media systems with contrasting structural features	Identification of predictor variables of relatively invariant cross-national/cultural outcomes
Most similar systems, different outcome	Media systems with similar structural features	Identification of predictor variables of individual country/culture-specific outcomes

(2) The “influence perspective” focuses on patterns of exchange, influence, dominance and resistance in the relationship between two or more entities. Studies that follow this perspective ask, for example, to what extent American mass media are in some respects dominant and exert influence to other media systems worldwide (Americanization of the Media, New World Information and Communication Order). (see also development communication, international communication)

(3) The “transgression perspective” is looking for mediated cross-border communication that leads to structures and processes beyond traditional nation state or cultural borders e.g., European public sphere), whereas the aforementioned influence perspective is stronger connected to the idea of fixed entities.

=== Levels of analysis ===
(1) “Individual/group”, (2) “organization”, (3) “state/society”, (4) “linguistic/political/cultural areas“ and (5) “the world/global level” constitute the five levels of analysis. These levels are (a) not hierarchal (e.g., mediated cross-border communication between groups in social media constituted by individuals from different places worldwide) and that (b) unit of analysis and record unit are not necessarily one and the same (e.g., foreign coverage of multiple newspapers as recording unit, which then get aggregated, compared and analyzed on a nation/society level).

=== Objects of analysis ===
A broad range of objects of analysis is subject to mediated cross-border communication research: (1) “media publics”, (2) “media contents”, (3) “media products”, (4) “media structures” and (5) “societal actors”. For example, in their study from 2004, Hallin and Mancini ask for the relationship between media and politics, hereby analyzing (among others) the development of national mass circulation press, literacy rates and the autonomy of journalists from societal actors (such as political parties and the government) from a comparative perspective.

== Research approaches ==
=== International communication ===
International communication research is concerned with communication that crosses nation state borders without actually contesting them. The field of international communication is characterized by an influence perspective, comparing for example news flows between national media systems in order to analyze, for example, structures of dominance and resistance. (see also: Media imperialism).

While this perspective has been central to the field of international communication throughout the 1960s and 1970s, there has been increasing criticism since the 1980s, with scholars arguing that it would lack to be able to explain the complexity of mediated cross-border communication and its effects (see also: Methodological refinements and the relativization of the media imperialism thesis).

=== Transnational communication ===
Being a more recent and emerging research approach, transnational communication is concerned with communication that transcends nation state borders, thus undermining their importance and eventually leading to structures and processes of transgression. Examples include:

- TV channels such as CNN, whose program is no longer directed toward particular national or cultural but global audiences.
- Media events such as the U.N. climate summits which contribute toward a globally defined identity
- Transnational civil society such as Amnesty International who contribute to the definition, awareness and spread of global issues such as human rights.

Especially the Europeanization of national public spheres has attracted major scholarly interest covered by this research approach drawing light to questions like for example to what extent discourses in European countries converge, or show signs of discursive integration and collective identification.

== Selected Key Findings, Criticism and Advancements ==
=== Media imperialism: the evolution of an influence perspective ===
A common frame to the debate on global media flows and export of US media contents to other countries by the early 1970s, the media imperialism thesis (see also cultural imperialism) has repeatedly been criticized for basing its assumptions on an over-simplified model of communication. Claiming forms of cultural dominance by Western media as a result of their worldwide commercial distribution, the thesis implicitly applied the idea of communication as a process of cause and effects (see also linear model of communication) to the field of mediated cross-border communication, thus disregarding the active interpretation and local adaption of media contents by their audiences

The latter can be illustrated by the global spread of hip hop culture: Originated in the USA during the 1970s, it has ever since then been integrated into local contexts throughout the world with distinct local adaptions in many diverse countries (see Hip-hop by country). For example, during the Arab Spring, a Libyan musician fueled the rebellion with his anti-government songs, connecting typical US rap music with local lyrics and issues.

On a methodological level, the criticism mentioned above has often been accompanied by a call for a shift of focus from the sheer quantitative supply to the particular consumption and use of media contents in order to adequately analyze their impact on, for example, the potential loss or homogenization of cultural identities For instance, in a seminal study by Liebes and Katz the authors found that globally exported US entertainment products such as the TV series Dallas encounter local contexts of interpretations formed by the particular cultural backgrounds of their recipients, thus showing that identical media contents may be read and adapted in very diverse ways. However, the degree to which an audience actively interprets media contents is also subject to variance, as subsequent research has shown.

Nevertheless, McQuail reports that the media imperialism thesis has been widely abandoned from the study of mediated cross-border communication. Today, the more advanced concepts of hybridization and glocalisation have gained increased attention by scholars as a way of conceptualizing the transformation, convergence and divergence of media systems.

=== Over-estimation of media globalization ===
Hafez argues that the qualitative dimension of mediated cross-border communication may be much different compared to what some scholars assume it would be. Speaking of the "myth of media globalization", Hafez warns not to confound technical potentials of media innovations with their actual use. For example, Hafez refers to statistics saying that while many people have access to foreign TV channels, the majority mainly uses national or local channels. Similar to that, most people use the Internet as a ‘local medium’, as the bulk of accessed websites and communication stays within national borders. The increasingly multilinguistic character of the Internet may even further the fragmentation of the World Wide Web into separate public spheres

Such notions concerned with the use of media correspond to insights on the level of media contents gained by an international comparative study of online-news websites conducted by Quandt, who found that in most cases coverage is much limited by the traditional, national context, concluding that online-news may not be as "global" as one might expect. In accordance with these findings, Halavais reported after surveying 4000 websites that although geographic borders may be removed from cyberspace, the 'real world' social structures keep inscribed online: the number of hyperlinks that cross international borders are significantly less compared to those which stay within national borders.

=== The making of a transnational public sphere: the case of Europe ===
For a long time, the academic debate on the existence of a transnational European public sphere was characterized by rather pessimistic viewpoints This kind of skepticism was fueled by assumption regarding (e.g.):

- the fragmented nature of national public spheres
- language barriers
- disinterest of audiences in European issues
- lack of transnational European media outlets.

However, empirical findings on mediated cross-border communication between national public spheres in Europe have contributed to an empirical informed re-assessment of the aforementioned pessimistic picture. While there is indeed only little empirical evidence on an emerging European public sphere in the sense of one that would replace the existing national public spheres, research has stressed the phenomenon of a transnationalization of national public spheres, allowing the latter remaining in place while at the same time contributing to transnational European debates. According to Brüggemann, Sifft, Kleinen-von-Königslöw, Peters, and Wimmel, this specific kind of transnationalization can empirically be measured in media coverage by the following dimensions:

Dimension	Description	Indicators
Vertical Dimension: Governance Surveillance	Public discourse on EU-institutions, EU-actors und EU-policies	Mentioning of EU-institutions; EU-policy as main topic of an article
Vertical Dimension: Collective Identity	Mediated establishment of a European community sense or feeling	Use of the expression "we Europeans"
Horizontal Dimension: Discourse Convergence	Media attention on other European countries	References to European countries
Horizontal Dimension: Discursive Integration	Mediated exchange of arguments and positions between European countries	Direct or indirect quotes of foreign actors;

A number of case- and longitudinal studies could show an intensifying observation of EU institutions and issues by national media, high but constant numbers of references to other European countries since the early 1980s, with powerful countries ranking on top. Although on a much lower level, this also holds true for the dimension of discursive integration, whereas only little evidence could be found for the emergence of a collective identity. Furthermore, a shared history of interdependency as well as population size respectively the corresponding political power showed to be valid predictors of the number of references to a given country. In sum, the studies mentioned above form the picture of a "nationally segmented Europeanization": Brüggemann, Hepp, Kleinen-von-Königslöw and Wessler (2009) use this term to describe the fact that while Europe as an issue of media coverage gains increasing public attention on the vertical dimension, undeniable deficits on the horizontal dimension and thus a strong dependence on national political and media structures remain stable.

== See also ==
- Mediated communication

== Research journals ==
Research on mediated cross-border communication can be found in a growing number of specialized scientific journals:

- International Communication Gazette
- Global Media and Communication
- European Journal of Communication
- Journal of International and Intercultural Communication
- Journal of International Communication

== Scholarly sections and working groups ==
Several academic associations cover issues related to mediated cross-border communication in specialized sections and working groups:

- International Communication Association: Division for "Global Communication and Social Change"
- International Communication Association: Division for "Intercultural Communication"
- European Communication Research and Education Association: Section on "International and Intercultural Communication"
- German Communication Association: Section on "International and Intercultural Communication"
- International Association for Media and Communication and Communication Research: Section on "International Communication"
