= North Atlantic or liberal model of media and politics =

The North Atlantic or liberal model of media and politics, as defined in Daniel C. Hallin and Paolo Mancini's Comparing Media Systems: Three Models of Media and Politics, is characterized by an early development of commercial press, information-oriented journalism, strong professionalization, and a market dominated media system.

== Newspaper industry ==
The newspaper industry within the liberal model is characterized by newspaper circulation and the early development of mass-circulation commercial press. The first instances of newspapers appearing in the west are during the 17th century in Europe with the first instance of what we would call a newspaper appearing in Germany. This paper was called the Strasbourg Relation. Although western civilization was not the first to invent the printing press, it had very early development of the media format that came from it known as "press". With the expansion of technology, commercial media quickly expanded to encompass many forms. It evolved from standard newspapers and became a part of radio, music, television, movies, and the Internet, as well as many other forms of media.

=== Political parallelism ===
Jonathan Hardy believes that political parallelism, "refers to the character of links between political actors and the media and more generally the extent to which media reflects political divisions." In their book, Comparing Media Systems: Three Models of Media and Politics, Daniel C. Hallin and Paolo Mancini use this term to evaluate the link between political parties and media organizations. In the North Atlantic or liberal model, Hallin and Mancini give a description of political parallelism in the United States, British, Irish, and Canadian media systems. According to Hallin and Mancini the United States contains the most unbiased political parallelism compared to the previous four countries. Hallin and Mancini express how press political partisanship is virtually absent in the North Atlantic or liberal model, with the exception of Britain which poses strong press parallelism. Hallin and Mancini insist that in the North Atlantic or liberal model there is a balance within the contents of the media in order to create neutrality within the media system. However, Hetty van Kempen believes it is still likely that press-party parallelism will still vary within the countries of the same model. Kempen reflects on the idea of Colin Seymour-Ure. Seymour-Ure states, "The same social forces that find expression in a party or parties of a political system tend to find expression also through the press." Ure's view illustrates that this is the reason why there is a weak political parallelism in the US and Canada. Hallin and Mancini consider that typically in a multiparty system the press seems to coincide with strong partisanship of the press.

=== Professionalization ===
According to Hallin and Mancini, the professionalization of journalism was strongly developed in the liberal countries. The authors refer to the development of journalistic practices, which is projected in the quality of political coverage. However, later the authors continue to illustrate how many contradictions emerge in the nature and the importance of context in professionalization of journalism within the liberal systems. Thomas E. Patterson believes Hallin and Mancini's discussion of the impact of journalism, and the influence the craft has on political influence is correct and unchallenged in the scholarly literature. Patterson explains that a tight clutch by the media to the state, as well as political institutions, creates professionalism. Patterson elaborates how a liberal culture will create an environment of journalistic autonomy, which in turn creates professionalism. Katrin Voltmer agrees that professionalization prevents dependency from outside perspective and influence to impose certain rules or norms on journalists. However, Voltmer also explains the difficulties within the classifications of professional journalistic performance. Voltmer enlightens the challenge of trying to bridge the gap between theory and practice of professionalization. Voltmer later elaborates how new and old norms, as well as new standards, of journalistic quality are finding it difficult to co-exist in finding their roles in the new democratic order.

=== Role of the state in media system ===
Media in western countries is highly market driven, this is due to the rise of consumerism thought to be mainly caused by the rise of the middle class during the early 19th century. The exception to this is strong public broadcasting in Britain and Ireland, which was, in most cases, the most common, or only, form of broadcasting. Since then, however, commercial broadcasting dominates most European countries. Government still plays a role in commercial broadcasting however. For instance newspaper subsidies go back to the 1970s and now exist in Belgium, Finland, France, the Netherlands, Norway, and Sweden. Public broadcasters, even in Europe, often face pressure from commercial broadcasting to compete by trying to appeal to larger audiences.
