= Research strategies of election campaign communication research =

Research strategies in the field of election campaign communication research are the decisions made concerning the objective, the scope, the sampling and the methodology used within a study of election campaign communication.

== Research objective ==
The overall purpose of conducting election campaign communication research is to reveal how election campaigns are organized with regard to communicational aspects as well as to show how and with what effect election campaigns are covered by media reports. A further goal refers to examining if and how country-specific context variables (e.g. history, political system) affect election campaign communication. In comparative election campaign communication research the objective is to analyze whether different countries share common practices with regard to the organization of campaign or the news coverage of elections.

When conducting election campaign communication research, the specific objective needs to be defined, going along with phrasing the research question. The objective as well as the research question is directly linked to the scope of a study.

== Scope of election campaign communication research ==
There are two main campaign communication channels, which can be examined when conducting election campaign communication research:

- party-controlled election campaign communication
- party-uncontrolled election campaign communication

Party-controlled campaign communication refers to "planned, coordinated communication efforts by candidates [or] parties", which includes e.g. party advertisements in newspapers or on television as well as party-owned websites or blogs. Based on collected feedback from opinion-polls or media monitoring about party-controlled communication, parties and candidates constantly adjust their communication strategies.

In contrast to party-controlled messages, media coverage of election campaigns – whether in newspapers, on television or online – is party-uncontrolled. Party-uncontrolled communication can either be journalist-controlled or journalist-uncontrolled. Research on party-uncontrolled, journalist-controlled newspapers articles and television reports about an election may detect journalistic interventionism, which affects – whether intended or not – the electorate. Party- and journalist-uncontrolled communication refers to everyday communication about election related topics by the electorate. Often in contrast with national media, political science scholars seek to compile long-term data and research on the impact of political issues and voting in U.S. presidential elections, producing in-depth articles breaking down the issues

A third election campaign communication channel refers to shared control about election related communication between political actors and media actors, i.e. a combination of the two main communication channels. Partly party-controlled and partly party-uncontrolled campaign communication refers to televised leader debates of election campaigns or talk shows, in which candidates or party-members are questioned by journalists or media actors. The following table illustrates the possible election campaign communication channels that can be analyzed.

Election campaign communication channels
party-controlled	party-controlled and party-uncontrolled	party-uncontrolled	
party advertising (print/broadcast/online); speeches by campaign candidates/party-members; staged events of campaign candidates/ party-members; local canvassing; online activities (party websites, blogs, presence in social networks)|	talk shows with campaign candidates; interviews with candidates on broadcast channels; leader debates (TV)	journalist-controlled	journalist-uncontrolled
party advertising (print/broadcast/online); speeches by campaign candidates/party-members; staged events of campaign candidates/ party-members; local canvassing; online activities (party websites, blogs, presence in social networks)|	talk shows with campaign candidates; interviews with candidates on broadcast channels; leader debates (TV)	news coverage (print/broadcast/online) e.g. news reports on news shows; journalistic blogs	websites/ blogs by voters; online discussions by voters; conversations about the election by voters (face-to-face, telephone)

Apart from party-controlled and party-uncontrolled election campaign communication the attitude and behavior of the electorate can be examined within election campaign research. Voter orientations can be analyzed by looking, e.g., at the "voters' use of the Internet for electoral information".

== Country sampling ==
With regard to election campaign communication research, two general approaches are possible:

- non-comparative, single-country research
- comparative research

=== Non-comparative research ===
Focusing on one single country allows in-depth analysis of the election campaign communication within this country. This way, variables influencing the campaign communication, such as the history and the political system of the considered country, can be taken into account. Joseph Trenaman and Denis McQuail, e.g., conducted a non-comparative, case study concerning the effects of television on political images in the British parliamentary election in 1959.

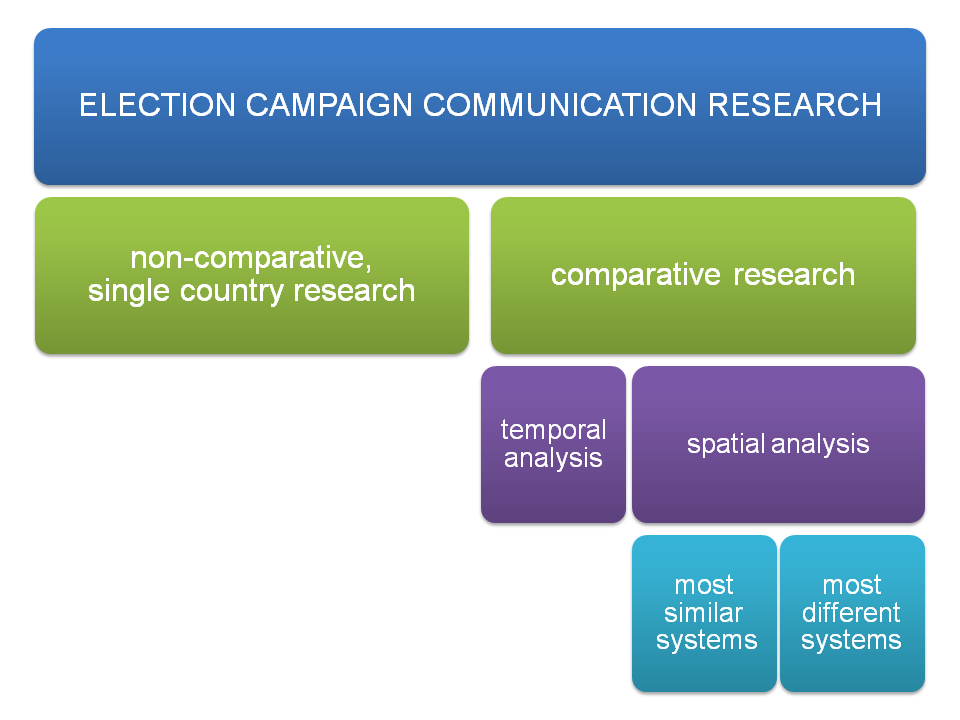
Approaches to election campaign communication research

=== Comparative research ===
Comparative research can either be spatial, i.e. comparing different countries, or temporal, which means taking a look at the campaign communication over time to examine longitudinal developments. A temporal analysis examining German newspaper coverage of election campaigns from 1949 to 1998, e.g., was conducted by Jürgen Wilke and Carsten Reinemann in 2001. Wilke and Reinemann showed an existing trend towards more interpretative coverage.

The goal of spatial comparative research is to show whether – despite all country-specific context variables – countries share common practices, e.g., with regard to the use of political commercials, the necessity for professional campaign consultants or the emerging importance of the media within election campaigns.

Comparative cross-country research can be differentiated with regard to the selection of particular countries. The possible options are:

- most similar systems, different outcome
- most different systems, similar outcome

Within a most similar systems-design, countries, which have similar media and political systems and thus share similar context variables, are compared to reveal possible differences. An example of a most similar systems-design is Jesper Strömbäck and Toril Aalberg's study on the news coverage of elections in the democratic corporatist countries Sweden and Norway.

If a most different system-design is used, the countries vary, e.g., with regard to their media system and their political campaign regulations. The research should reveal whether despite the differences similarities exist. The most far reaching study on election campaign communication using a most different system-design was conducted by Gunda Plasser and Fritz Plasser in 2002. Plasser and Plasser examined the attitudes and roles of political campaign consultants in 43 countries around the globe.

=== The number of cases ===
In comparative research a minimum of two objects or cases has to be taken into account. Two-country studies considering election campaign news coverage e.g. are Jesper Strömbäck's studies which take a closer look at the similarities and differences between Swedish and U.S. American news coverage during election campaigns. Since the results of two-country studies only have a limited ability to be generalized, further studies take on a rather global perspective and thus compare more than two countries. In general, a distinction can be made between small-N analysis, which allows e.g. in-depth analyses of up to ten countries, medium-N analysis and large-N analysis, which mostly make use of a quantitative approach with statistical analyses testing a small number of variables in many cases.

== Research methods ==
=== Methodological developments ===
Political communication, and as a subfield of it election campaign communication, is studied within several disciplines of social sciences including communication studies, political science, psychology as well as sociology. Research across disciplines leads to the development of a variety of different research methods. In the past scholars mainly examined single countries, i.e. conducting non-comparative, case studies. Comparative election campaign communication research arrived in the 1970s. In contrast to simple observation, which was historically used as research method to reveal how political communication is received and which consequences result, today, study methods are more deliberate and systematic. Quantitative approaches, e.g., include the formulation and testing of hypotheses by sophisticated statistical analyses. Due to the development of new campaign techniques, such as party-controlled digital and data campaigning, or online news coverage, research strategies need to be further adapted.

=== Methods ===
Commonly used research methods in election campaign communication research are:

1. content analysis
2. survey research
3. experimental analysis
4. network analysis

Survey research (e.g. interviews with campaign consultants or voters) and content analysis (e.g. of newspaper articles or campaign advertising) are the most widely used research methods in election campaign communication research. Apart from the four research methods, there are further, infrequently used methods in election campaign communication research, such as linguistic analysis, which focuses the wording, meaning and context of chosen words within, e.g., political speeches by campaign candidates.

Election campaign communication can be examined using one single research method or a multitude of methods. A "multimethod study on the role of television during the European election campaign" in 1979 has been conducted by Jay Blumler, combining survey research of party-representatives and voters with a "content analysis of campaign reporting".

All research methods "start with the collection of data and finish with data analysis". In comparative research, either an emic or an etic approach can be applied. In an emic approach data collection measurements are developed culture-specifically, thus, e.g. creating a slightly adapted questionnaire for each considered country with regard to its systemic context. In contrast, an etic approach uses one universal instrument in all considered countries.

==== Content analysis as research method ====
Content analysis is a "systematic analysis of selected written, spoken, or audiovisual text". It "is the most hallowed and most widely used method of political communication research".

Focusing on party-uncontrolled media coverage of election campaigns single news articles or reports (newspaper/television/online) function as unit of analysis. An example of a study on party-uncontrolled communication is Frank Esser's research on the usage of sound and image bites within political news culture in France, (Germany), Great Britain and the United States.

A category that can be coded with regard to articles or broadcasts is the metaframe of politics (game frame vs. issue frame). The metaframe refers to whether an article frames politics in terms of a game or personality contest between political actors (game frame) or rather focuses the issue positions of a candidate or a party (issue frame). The contextual frame (episodic frame vs. thematic frame) is another category that can be analyzed when examining party-uncontrolled media coverage of election campaigns. An episodic frame refers to isolated reporting focusing on a specific event removed from its context, whereas thematic framing is present in news stories which position the event in a broader context or deal with its meanings for society. Within a content analysis the existence of journalistic interventionism can be detected. Applying certain editorial packaging techniques can e.g. lead to negative journalistic intervention, i.e. presenting a campaign candidate in a negative, anti-candidate way in the news.

With regard to party-controlled communication, e.g., election commercials or websites can be examined using a content analysis. In 1994 Christina Holtz-Bacha, Lynda Lee Kaid, and Anne Johnston, e.g., conducted a comparative study about election campaign television advertising in the western democracies (Germany), France and United States making use of content analysis as research method. Possible aspects that can be analyzed with regard to party-controlled television advertisings are their dominant format (documentary, issue, issue presentation, etc.), their focus (positive/negative) and their emphasis, i.e. whether the spot presents an issue or tries to create and maintain an image. Other aspects that can be examined using a content analysis are the production aspects of a television commercial, referring to the setting (formal/informal; indoors/outdoors), the camera angle or the sound characteristics. Which components are focused within an analysis always depends on the research interest and the research question.

===== Problems and challenges of content analysis =====
Manual coding in content analysis, conducted by human coders, is connected to high costs. High costs of manual coding arise partly due to the fact that coders must be trained to assure inter-coder reliability. Another challenge with regard to content analysis refers to the possible existence of multiple meanings of a message, i.e. of a given answer, and the coding of it.

Due to their changeability, the usage of online databases on election campaign communication (e.g. American National Election Study) as data source for content analysis can lead to further methodological problems concerning the traceability and the ability to replicate the study. Additionally, researchers critically have to consider the collection methods of the used data source.

==== Survey as research method ====
Survey research includes small-scale surveys, i.e. interviews using mostly open-ended structures, as well as large-scale surveys, which make use of standardized questionnaires. A survey can be conducted face-to-face, via telephone, or making use of computer-assisted services. To gain in-depth knowledge of campaign practices, interviews can e.g. be conducted with candidates or campaign committees who coordinate the party-controlled election campaign communication. The most far-reaching large-scale survey in comparative election campaign communication research is Gunda and Fritz Plasser's Global Consultancy Survey. The survey was conducted between 1998 and 2000 with 502 external political consultants from 43 countries including questions on their attitudes and their role definitions. The single interviews, consisting of 27 questions, were conducted face-to-face or via mail. The sampling reprised from membership lists of professional organizations, but also from using the snowball approach. A further in-depth survey was conducted by Plasser and Plasser with 24 American consultants about their experiences with regard to cultural barriers and challenges in international cooperations.

===== Problems and challenges in survey research =====
Survey research always has to make sure to define an adequate sample of interview partners. Finding such an adequate sample may bear some challenges, especially in comparative election campaign communication research. If scholars are not familiar with the local election network in a country they can deal with the complex task of finding e.g. major professional national campaign consultants by using membership lists of professional organizations or a snowball-sampling-approach. Disadvantageous, if a sample is not carefully selected, results may be biased. Internet survey research, in particular, is problematic with regard to selecting a representative sample.

If a study does not document its exact research design and instruments, the results are not transparent, which can lead to misunderstandings and misinterpretations. Therefore, the procedural method should explicitly be stated in a study.

Further challenges when using survey research refer to the statistical assessment and interpretation of answers to open-ended questions as well as the translation and phrasing of questionnaires. In standardized large-scale surveys the accuracy and veracity of answers cannot be assured, since the research relies on the interview partners' individual self-assessments of the questions and pre-formulated answers.

==== Experimental analysis as research method ====
Experiments, conducted in laboratory settings, allow the testing of effects resulting from mere exposure to controlled stimuli. This research method is primarily used in psychological approaches to election campaign communication research. Experiments can, e.g., detect the effects election campaign commercials have on the electorate. By exposing subjects to particular election spots and varying specific details in the ad, the variables causing an effect can be revealed. June Woong Rhee, e.g., makes use of two kinds of experiments in his study on framing effects in election campaign news coverage. To examine the influence of framing effects on voters' interpretation of campaigns, a broadcast-print experiment and a broadcast-only experiment were conducted. As pretest, the participants of the study had to write a letter about the 1992 U.S. presidential election campaign. Afterwards the participants were confronted with print and broadcast news stories about the 1991 Philadelphia mayoral election campaign, which were created using a strategy or an issue frame and simulating the actual coverage. Conditions, e.g., within the broadcast-print experiment were strategy frames in broadcast and print news, issue frames in broadcast and print news, or a mixture, i.e., either an issue frame in printed news and a strategy frame in broadcasts, or strategy-framed broadcast and issue-framed print news. The participants of the experiments were "asked to read or watch the news stories for five days in their homes". After the five days of exposure to the manipulated news, the participants met with the experimenter and, as a posttest, had to "write a letter about the Philadelphia mayoral campaign". To interpret the results a content analysis was conducted by Rhee. The study revealed that "both strategy-framed and issue-framed print news stories are effective in influencing campaign interpretation".

===== Problems and challenges in experimental research =====
In election campaign communication research the obvious problem arising from laboratory experiments is to the artificial setting, which makes it difficult to apply results to situations in natural settings; this, e.g., refers to an intensive exposure to a campaign television advertising in an experimental setting in contrast to exposure to television advertising in a homey and distracting situation. Another challenge refers the sampling of experimental subjects. Mostly, college students function as participants in laboratory research, which may distort the results and limit their ability to be generalized.

==== Network analysis as research method ====
Within network analysis the focus lies on the interactive aspects of communication, revealing, e.g., which information is communicated and who communicates with whom. The communicators, i.e. the electorates or politicians, are seen as "nodes in a network of interdependent relationships". Network analysis can be used to examine "the channels of communications within large political units like a state" or smaller units like personal networks.

A network analysis of weblogs connected to campaigning in the German federal election 2005 was, e.g., conducted by Steffen Albrecht, Maren Lübcke and Rasco Hartig-Perschke. 317 campaign weblogs by politicians and non-political actors were examined along three dimensions of analysis: activity, interactivity, and connectedness. The sample was selected using search engines, existing pertinent lists and the snowball approach. Some of the aspects that were analyzed are the quantity of postings by the blog author, the quantity of feedback received from readers and "the connectedness of weblogs by means of blogroll links". The network analysis revealed the network structure of the blogosphere, showing that the interconnection of blogs was not that prevalent during the 2005 election campaign. Out of the 317 examined campaign weblogs the "majority of the blogs (187, 59%) had no blogroll links to other campaign blogs". Furthermore, party-oriented weblogs primarily link to weblogs of the same party.

== Challenges within election campaign communication research ==
In election campaign communication research, especially in comparative research, some difficulties are faced:

=== Consideration of country-specific contexts ===
Since campaign operations are influenced by context variables, it is necessary to know those system-inherent variables when conducting election campaign communication research. "For empirical research this knowledge is essential for forming hypotheses and making predictions about campaign styles".

The systemic variables influencing modern campaigning are:

- the election system (e.g. presidential vs. parliamentary system, majoritarian vs. coalitional system),
- the structure of party competition (e.g. few-party vs. multi-party system)
- the regulation of campaigns (e.g. access to television advertisements, campaign funding),
- the national political culture (e.g. trust in politicians, turnout rates),
- the national media system (e.g. television-centered vs. print-centered, public service vs. autonomous broadcast systems),
- the current situation (e.g. current events, socio economic situation).

The context variables should especially be taken into account when choosing a most different systems-design, since they can be the possible causes of country-specific differences.

=== Theoretical diversity ===
In comparative research, international research teams have to face "difficulties that arise from differences in academic cultures". There are several strategies to deal with difficulties arising from the theoretical diversity in international research teams. Three strategies of how to manage this theoretical diversity, postulated by David L. Swanson, are:

- avoidance strategy
- pretheoretical strategy
- metatheoretical strategy

The avoidance strategy is regarded as the simplest approach when dealing with theoretical diversity of comparative research. The cross-national research is conducted by a team from one country or one cultural background and thus avoiding complexity and theoretical alternatives. "Using a pretheoretical strategy means that the international team of researchers agrees upon common research questions and the methods to be employed". "Studies are undertaken without a strict theoretical framework until results are ready to be interpreted". When the subject of study is approached in a metatheoretical way by an international research team a variety of theoretical backgrounds is used to analyze the data.

=== Linguistic challenges ===
Spatial comparative research on election campaigning does not only face linguistic challenges within an international research team but also with regard to analyzing news reports and campaign advertising from different countries or phrasing and translating questionnaires. To deal with linguistic diversity, a translation-oriented approach can be chosen. When conducting surveys linguistic equivalence of a questionnaire can be achieved by translating the original questionnaire into the language of the considered country and, additionally, translating it back into the original language. This translation procedure can be repeated until both questionnaire versions are equivalent. To achieve linguistic equivalence by translating questionnaires the specific connotations of used words need to be known by the researchers, because words can have different connotations in different cultural backgrounds.

=== Compilation approach ===
Comparisons of election campaign communication can either be conducted by one team looking at different countries (leading to theoretical diversity) or by scholars compiling case studies and drawing conclusions from them. Drawing conclusions from a compilation of case studies can lead to methodological problems. Country experts provide single report about the election campaign communication in different countries, eventually following guidelines designed by the editors. The methodological problem refers to the lack of a unified data set, i.e. the research within the countries does not use equivalent methods and measurements especially designed for the sample of countries (either using a more etic or emic approach to achieve equivalence). To deal with methodological problems rising from a compilation approach, several aspects have to be considered: creation of chapter homogeneity by following a guideline, awareness for the logic of comparative research, and creation of a systematized synthesis when drawing conclusions. Nevertheless, the validity of cross-national conclusions remains comprised, since no aggregate data set, derived from identical research conduction, exists. Nevertheless, the compilation approach can provide an insight into communication differences in election campaigns around the globe. Swanson and Mancini published such a compilation in 1996 to compare election campaign styles of eleven countries.

=== Functional equivalence ===
In spatial comparative election campaign communication research, "comparability and the maintenance of equivalence can be seen as the major problems". Research objects are not always equivalent, since they are integrated into different culture-specific contexts (e.g. in "social, political, economic, legal, and media contexts"). To conduct comparative research, the regarded objects, e.g. newspaper reports on election campaigning, have to be at least equivalent in their functionality.

Functional equivalence of the research objects should be tested on different levels of analysis, i.e. on the level of the construct (construct equivalence), on the item level (item equivalence) and on the level of the method (method equivalence). Item equivalence, e.g., refers to equally verbalizing items in a survey, i.e. exact culture-specific wording in questionnaires. To avoid item bias questionnaires need to be pretested, e.g. by using a translation procedure to deal with linguistic diversity. Construct equivalence does exist, if the object of investigation is equivalently embedded into the higher system level in all countries. Method equivalence summarizes three further levels of equivalence: sample equivalence, instrument equivalence, and administration equivalence. If the units of analysis or interview partners, e.g. campaign consultants, are equivalently selected in every considered country, sample equivalence exists. One aspect of instrument equivalence, e.g., refers to whether participants in an online survey are familiar with using computers and filling in online questionnaires. Administration equivalence, e.g., refers to attitudes of interviewers, not varying culture-specifically in a survey, which would lead to culture-specific statements.

If functional equivalence is not guaranteed cultural bias can occur leading to misinterpretation of results. Cultural bias results if country-specific variables are not considered in the analysis. When, e.g., comparing the length of news articles about election campaigns in different countries, they need to be standardized with the mean article length in each country.

In sum, the concept of functional equivalence implies realizing that applying identical research instruments in different countries does not necessarily lead to measuring exactly the same phenomenon, due to culture-specific differences.

== See also ==
- Comparative politics
- Journalistic interventionism § Interventionism in election campaigns
