= Hybrid =

Hybrid may refer to:

== Science ==
- Hybrid (biology), an offspring resulting from cross-breeding
  - Hybrid grape, grape varieties produced by cross-breeding two Vitis species
  - Hybridity, the property of a hybrid plant which is a union of two different genetic parent strains
- Hybrid (particle physics), a valence quark-antiquark pair and one or more gluons
- Hybrid orbital (chemistry); see Orbital hybridisation
- Hybrid solar eclipse, a rare solar eclipse type
- Hybrid star (disambiguation), with properties normally found in different types of stars

== Technology ==
=== Transportation ===
- Hybrid vehicle (disambiguation), various types of vehicles referred to as hybrids
- Hybrid rail, an urban rail service for passengers using lightweight trains
- Hybrid rocket, a rocket motor using propellants from two different states of matter
- Hybrid shipping container, a container using phase change material in combination with the ability to recharge itself
- Hybrid train, a locomotive, railcar, or train that uses an onboard rechargeable energy storage system

=== Electricity and electronics ===
- Hybrid generator, an electric power system comprising two or more generators that supply power to a single output
- Hybrid power, the combination of a power producer and the means to store that power in an energy storage medium
  - Hybrid power source, a stand-alone power system that operates independently of a larger power grid network
- Hybrid coil, a type of electrical transformer
- Hybrid coupler, a passive device used in radio and telecommunications
- Hybrid integrated circuit, a miniaturized electronic circuit combining different semiconductor devices and passive components on a substrate
- Hybrid mass spectrometer, a combination of m/z separation devices of different types
- Telephone hybrid, a type of telephone circuit
- Three-way hybrid, a device to converge content delivered via three different video transport networks

=== Computing ===
- Hybrid laptop or hybrid tablet, a cross between a tablet computer and a laptop, running mobile operating system
- Hybrid computer, a computer combining analog and digital features
- Hybrid graphics, discrete and integrated graphics processing units
- Hybrid drive, a device that combines a solid-state drive with hard disk drive

=== Materials ===
- Hybrid material, a composite of two constituents at the nanometer or molecular level
- Hybrid gemstone, a stone combining natural material with artificial material
- Hybrid paper-polymer banknote, a mixture of paper and polymer substance to make a secure banknote

== Arts, entertainment, and media ==
=== Fictional entities ===
- Hybrid (DC Comics), a fictional group of super villains
- Hybrid (Jimmy Marks), a fictional super villain in the Marvel Comics universe
- Hybrid (mythology), a creature combining body parts of two or more species
- Hybrid (Underworld), the resulting offspring when cross-mating Immortals, Vampires and Lycans
- Hybrid (Scott Washington), a fictional anti-hero in the Marvel Comics universe

=== Films ===
- Hybrid (1997 film), a 1997 horror by Fred Olen Ray
- Hybrid, a 2000 documentary in the List of POV episodes
- Hybrid (2007 film), a 2007 Syfy television film, 10th in the Maneater series
- Hybrids (2015 film), a comedy starring Paul Sorvino
- Hybrids (2017 film), an animated short
- The Hybrid (film), a 2014 science-fiction film directed by Billy O'Brien

=== Games ===
- Hybrid (video game), 2012, by 5th Cell for Xbox Live Arcade
- Tekken Hybrid, a 2011 PlayStation 3 game based on the movie Tekken: Blood Vengeance

=== Music ===
- Hybrid (British band), an electronic music group
- Hybrid (Spanish band), an extreme metal band
- Hybrid (Michael Brook album), a 1985 album by Michael Brook featuring the infinite guitar, or the title track
- Hybrid (Gary Numan album), a 2002 album consisting of songs by Gary Numan remixed by other artists, or the title track
- Hybrid Theory, the debut album by Linkin Park, who were once known by the same name
- Hybrids (album), a 1999 remix album by the Creatures
- Hybrid Black, 2019 studio album by Balzac
- Hybrid (Collie Buddz album), a 2019 reggae and hip-hop album by Collie Buddz
- "Hybrid", a song by Lil Yachty from his 2021 mixtape Michigan Boy Boat
- Hybrid Recordings, a record label that is a division of Metropolitan Talent

=== Other arts, entertainment, and media ===
- Hybrid genre, a blend of different categories of art or culture
- Hybrids (novel), a book in the Neanderthal Parallax trilogy by Robert J. Sawyer

== Sports ==
- Hybrid (golf), a golf club that has the characteristics between a wood and an iron
- Hybrid martial arts, fighting systems that incorporate techniques and theories from several martial arts

== Other uses ==
- Blended learning, also known as hybrid learning, an educational model where some students attend class in-person, while others join the class virtually from home
- Hybrid beasts in folklore, mythological creatures which combine different animals
- Hybrid Graphics, often "Hybrid", a former graphics software company in Helsinki, Finland
- Hybrid library, a library containing a mix of print and electronic resources
- Hybrid mail, mail delivered using a combination of electronic and physical methods
- Hybrid market, a system allowing stock trades to be completed either electronically or manually
- Hybrid organization, an organization that mixes elements of various sectors of society
- Hybrid (people), used to describe people of mixed ancestry in colonial empires, now considered offensive
- Hybrid security, a type of economic instrument
- Hybrid warfare, a military strategy
- Hybrid word, a word derived from more than one language
- Remote work, also known as hybrid work, the practice of working from elsewhere than in an office

== See also ==
- 2-in-1 PC
- Hybrid language (disambiguation)
- Hybrid tea (disambiguation)
- Hybridisation (disambiguation)
- The Hybrid (disambiguation)
