= Americanization in election campaign communication =

Adoption of American election campaign strategies

Americanization in election campaign communication is the adaptation of particular, successful election campaign elements and strategies, first developed in the United States, in other countries. Two main characteristics of Americanization are the instrumental relationship between politics and media and the professionalization of election campaigns. The campaign techniques can be applied or adapted to different extents.

Since the concept was established in the 1970s and 80s, many recent studies have criticized and disproved the idea, because it neglects the different adaptations and variations of election campaigns between countries. Researchers arguing against the appropriateness of the concept Americanization point to the concepts of hybridization and modernization of election campaigns worldwide, which act as oppositions to Americanization.

Furthermore, there is a wide range of studies about Americanization in election campaign communication, which use the term in slightly different ways. For example, the term is applied to different groups – such as politicians, media or electorates.

== Characteristics of Americanization ==
Americanization in election campaign communication contains different characteristics concerning the levels of campaigning. The main aspect is the modification of political action towards the logic of media, as happened in American election campaigns. This means for example that politicians fit their appearance to the rules of television.

Different Levels of Americanization and the used strategies.
Level	Strategies
organization	professionalization, events
style	stage-management
content	de-ideologization
medium	television, visualizing, emotions
communicational strategy	personalization

In most research literature professionalization is mentioned as the main characteristic of Americanization. Professionalization is subordinated to the level of organizations and does therefore concern the terms of campaign condition more than the actual campaign contents. Throughout changes in campaigning, professionalization is the production of electoral content with marketing methods.

Other aforementioned strategies can be merged in the orientation towards the medium television: Campaigns contain political events especially designed for the media, where politicians offer emotions and pictures for the camera. Therefore, the whole event is stage-managed; the politician is in the focus of attention – less the content of the parties’ election program. This phenomenon is also called de-ideologization, which means strategic orientation of campaigning being geared to marketing policies.

== Americanization from two different points of view ==
When looking at Americanization there are two different points of view, which differ in the way Americanization processes work.

=== The diffusion point of view ===
The first one is the diffusion approach, which considers Americanization as a directional, one-way process. In this perspective the high increase of US-American strategies of electoral campaigning is based on voluntariness of other countries in applying them.

=== The modernization point of view ===
The second one is the modernization theory, which argues that Americanization of election campaign communication is “the consequence of an ongoing structural change in politics, society and the media system” worldwide. This theory's proponents’ say, that Americanization comes from an endogenous change – meaning a change which is originated in the interior of the countries. The development towards US-American structures in election campaigning is a result of this change, but not the reason of it. Americanization is a sub-category of modernization, as Swanson and Mancini define:

"We hypothesize that adoption of Americanized campaign methods may reflect a wider, more general process that is producing changes in many societies, changes which are difficult to attribute to a single cause and which go far beyond politics and communication. [...] [W]e call this more general process ‘modernization’."

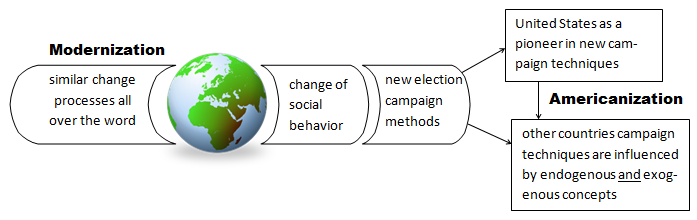
Figure 1: Modernization process with Americanization as a sub-category

Furthermore, the term modernization is often used as an alternative to Americanization to emphasize that changes in political communication around the world are not only created by the U.S.-American ideals, but are also “rooted in a process of social change” which emerge from individual countries themselves. In this point of view the term modernization replaces the term Americanization.

The concept of using modernization as an alternative to Americanization has been criticized by Hallin and Mancini for carrying an evolutionist connotation, as “an implicit assumption that change is to be seen as ‘progress’, necessary and unilinear. It also lumps together many dimensions of change – technological, cultural, political, and economic – that need to be distinguished [...].” Nevertheless there are researchers who prefer using the term modernization instead of Americanization. [see also: Criticism]

In addition to the two different uses of the term modernization relating to Americanization, some studies use modernization as a synonym for Americanization.

== Examples: Americanization in Europe and beyond ==
Characteristics of Americanization in election campaign communication can be found in different countries all over the world. Nevertheless most research concentrates on Europe when analyzing this phenomenon.

=== Germany ===
In Germany the “shopping model” of Americanization can be found, as German campaign managers get in contact with their colleagues from the United States, observe their campaign practices and adapt some strategies, but not without giving them a local, national spin. Nevertheless, a study of the election of 1990 shows that despite the highly personalized election, the voters did not “fixate on candidate instead of on issues.” This shows that country-specific contexts of the political systems, such as the party-oriented election system in Germany, are relevant for changes in campaigning as well.

=== Great Britain ===
Researchers discovered in the parliamentary election of 1997 in Great Britain similar campaign strategies of Tony Blair for New Labour and Bill Clinton. Studies talk about a Clintonization of political communication practices. Under the influence of America the structure of the Labour Party shifted “toward one more suitable for a media-based campaign, drawing on Clinton’s earlier experience”. For example, did the parties use rapid-response techniques, “to ensure that their message is not distorted through media and opposition attacks”. This technique pioneered in the Clinton campaign 1992.

=== Israel ===
Since 1981, American political consultants have functioned as advisers during various election campaigns in Israel. In an article about American political consultants in Israel for the election of 1999 Journalist Adam Nagourney describes the imitated techniques:

“Sound bites, rapid response, repetition, wedge issues, ethnic exploitation, nightly polling, negative research, searing attack advertisements on television -- the familiar tools of American elections have now arrived in the Middle East.”

== Criticism ==
The concept of Americanization in election campaign communication has been criticized in different ways. In one point of view, critics argue that there are indeed changes in campaigning worldwide, but decline the term Americanization:

“The term Americanization proves to be primarily used by the media as a catchword to avoid complicated comparisons. Despite all the differences in the concrete campaign procedures, similarities are also observed [...].”

Focusing on the context of electoral systems as well, opponents of the Americanization concept criticize the one-sidedness of the strategy transfer from the US to other countries by forgetting the development of greater social structures.

Another point of view is the acceptance of the possibility of the concept itself, but the refusal of its impact. Even if Americanization is actually happening, not all changes in political campaigning can be ascribed to practices of the United States. Country-specific studies show that there is little to none imitation of American campaign strategies. In the contrary it has been shown that campaigning worldwide is very hybrid. The concept of hybridization shows “country specific supplementation of traditional campaign practices with select features of the media-driven, postmodern style of campaigning.”

== See also ==
- Americanization
- Political campaign
- Hybridization in political election campaign communication
- Modernization
- Transformation processes (media systems)
