= Jean K. Chalaby =

Swiss sociologist

Jean K. Chalaby is a sociologist who specializes in global media, transnational television (including channels and formats), comparative media studies, and media history. After receiving his PhD from the London School of Economics in 1994, from the year 2000 Chalaby began working as a researcher and senior lecturer in the Department of Sociology at City University in London. He is now Professor of International Communication at City St George's, University of London.

== Publications ==
=== Books ===
- Chalaby, Jean K. (2023). Television in the Streaming Era: The Global Shift. Cambridge University Press. ISBN 978-1009199261.
- Chalaby, Jean K. (2015). The Format Age: Television's Entertainment Revolution. Polity. ISBN 978-1509502585.
- (2009) Transnational Television in Europe: Reconfiguring Global Communications Networks. London: I.B. Tauris.
- (2005) Transnational Television Worldwide: Towards a New Media Order, London: I.B. Tauris
- (2002) The de Gaulle Presidency and the Media: Statism and Public Communications, Basingstoke: Palgrave Macmillan
- (1998) The Invention of Journalism, Basingstoke: Macmillan; New York: St Martin Press. Edited collection

=== Book chapters and journal articles ===
- Chalaby, Jean K. (2016). "Television and globalization: The TV content global value chain". Journal of Communication. 66 (1): 35–59. doi:10.1111/jcom.12203.
- Chalaby, Jean K. (2015). "The advent of the transnational TV format trading system: A global commodity chain analysis". Media, Culture & Society. 37 (3): 460–478. doi:10.1177/0163443714567017.
- (2007) ‘Journalism and the Two Industrial Revolutions of the Twentieth Century’, in M. Broersma (ed.) Form and Style in Journalism: European Newspapers and the Representation of News, 1880–2005, pp. 235–243. Leuven: Peeters
- (2007) ‘One Nation, One State, One Television: Making Sense of de Gaulle’s Broadcasting Policy’, in J. Wardhaugh (ed.) Paris and the Right in the Twentieth Century, pp. 86–103. Newcastle: Cambridge Scholars Publishing
- (2006) ‘Television for a New Global Order: Transnational Television Networks and the Formation of Global Systems’ [in Mandarin], pp. 272–291 in S. Sun (ed.) Global Media Policies: New Perspectives. Shanghai: Shanghai Joint Press
- (2005) ‘Introduction: Towards an Understanding of Media Transnationalism’, pp. 1–13 in J. Chalaby (ed.) Transnational Television Worldwide London: I.B. Tauris
- (2005) ‘The Quiet Invention of a New Medium: Twenty Years of Transnational Television in Europe’, pp. 43–65 in J. Chalaby (ed.) Transnational Television Worldwide London: I.B. Tauris
- (2004) ‘L’adaptation des programmes européens aux marchés nationaux : L’exemple d’Eurosport en Grande-Bretagne’ [‘The Adaptation of European programming to national markets: The case of Eurosport in Great Britain’], pp. 231–241 in D. Marchetti (ed.) En quête d’Europe : Médias européens et médiatisation de l’Europe Rennes: Presses Universitaires de Rennes
- (2003) ‘Transnational television in Europe: Affluence without influence’, pp. 13–30 in M. Bond (ed.) Europe, Parliament and the Media London: The Federal Trust for Education and Research
- (2000) ‘Northcliffe: Proprietor as Journalist’, pp. 25–41 in P. Catterall, C. Seymour-Ure and A. Smith (eds) Northcliffe's Legacy: Aspects of the British Popular Press, 1896-1996 Basingstoke: Macmillan; New York: St Martin Press; London: Institute of Contemporary British History
