= The Hybrid =

The Hybrid may refer to:

- Hybrid (DC Comics), a fictional group of supervillains appearing in DC Comics
- The Hybrid (album), an album by Danny Brown
- "The Hybrid" (The Vampire Diaries), an episode of the television series The Vampire Diaries
- The Hybrid (film), 2014 (original title "Scintilla")

== See also ==
- Hybrid (disambiguation)
