= Theodore L. Glasser =

American academic

- Education: University of Iowa
- Employer: Stanford University

Theodore L. Glasser is an American academic. He is professor emeritus of communication at Stanford University, and the author of several books about American journalism. His scholarship focuses on questions of press responsibility and accountability.

Glasser believes journalists must put social justice advocacy above objective reporting because journalistic objectivity is a myth. Instead of ever achieving objectivity, Glasser and co-author James Ettema were the first to demonstrate that norms of professional journalism amount to an attempt to "objectify morality" According to Glasser, "Journalists need to be overt and candid advocates for social justice, and it's hard to do that under the constraints of objectivity."

== Professional background ==
Theodore "Ted" Glasser is professor emeritus in the Department of Communication, Stanford University, where for several years he was also affiliated with the Modern Thought and Literature Program. For 14 years he directed Stanford's Graduate Program in Journalism.

His several books include Normative Theories of the Media: Journalism in Democratic Societies, written with Clifford G. Christians, Denis McQuail, Kaarle Nordenstreng and Robert A. White, which won the Frank Luther Mott-Kappa Tau Alpha Award for Best Research-Based Book on Journalism/Mass Communication; Custodians of Conscience: Investigative Journalism and Public Virtue, written with James S. Ettema, which also won the Frank Luther Mott-Kappa Tau Alpha Award as well as the Society of Professional Journalists’ Sigma Delta Chi Award for Research about Journalism and Pennsylvania State University's Bart Richards Award for Media Criticism.

Glasser's research, commentaries and book reviews have appeared in a variety of publications, including Journalism Studies; Journal of Communication; Journalism: Theory, Practice and Criticism; Journalism & Mass Communication Quarterly; Critical Studies in Media Communication; Journal of Media Ethics; Policy Sciences; Journal American History; Quill; Nieman Reports and The New York Times Book Review. He is currently serving on the editorial boards of seven academic journals.

In 2002-2003 he served as president of the Association for Education in Journalism and Mass Communication (AEJMC). He had earlier served two terms as a vice president and chair of the Mass Communication Division of the International Communication Association. He has held visiting faculty appointments as a Senior Fulbright Scholar at the Hebrew University of Jerusalem; as the Wee Kim Wee Professor of Communication Studies at Nanyang Technological University, Singapore; and at the University of Tampere, Finland.

On Stanford's campus, he was for 19 years a member of the board of directors of The Stanford Daily Publishing Corporation, including a brief stint as board chair; and for nine years a member of the program committee of the John S. Knight Fellowships program for mid-career journalists. Locally, he served for 15 years as a member of the board of directors of Cable Co-op, the cooperatively owned and operated cable system that served Palo Alto, Stanford and neighboring towns. He continues to serve on the Advisory Council of the Mid-Peninsula Community Media Center.

Glasser came to Stanford in 1990 from the University of Minnesota, where he taught in the School of Journalism and Mass Communication and served as the founding associate director of the Silha Center for the Study of Media Ethics and Law. His first faculty appointment was at the University of Hartford. He received his Ph.D. in 1979 from the University of Iowa, where in 2011 he was inducted into the School of Journalism and Mass Communication's Hall of Fame, an honor he shares with, among many others, George Gallup, Wilbur Schramm and Hanno Hardt, his mentor and academic adviser at Iowa.

== Selected books ==
- Ettema, James S.; Glasser, Theodore (1998). Custodians of Conscience: Investigative Journalism and Public Virtue. New York City: Columbia University Press. ISBN 9780231106740. OCLC 911291998.
- Normative Theories of the Media: Journalism in Democratic Societies. By Clifford Christians, Theodore L. Glasser, Denis McQuail, Kaarle Nordenstreng and Robert White. Urbana: University of Illinois Press. ISBN 9780252090837.
- The Idea of Public Journalism. Edited by Theodore L. Glasser. New York: Guilford Press. ISBN 9781572304604.
- Public Opinion and the Communication of Consent. Edited by Theodore L. Glasser and Charles T. Salmon. New York: Guilford Press, 1995. ISBN 9780898624991.
- Media Freedom and Accountability. Edited by Everette E. Dennis, Donald M. Gillmor, and Theodore L. Glasser. Westport, Conn: Greenwood Press, 1989. ISBN 9780313267277.

== Selected articles ==
- "On Readability and Listenability," ETC: A Review of General Semantics, XXXII (June 1975): 138-142.
- "Newsworthy Accusations and the Privilege of Neutral Reportage," Communication Quarterly, 28 (Spring 1980): 49-56.
- "Play, Pleasure, and the Value of Newsreading," Communication Quarterly, 30 (Spring 1982): 101-107.
- "Objectivity Precludes Responsibility," The Quill, February 1984, 13-16.
- "On the Morality of Secretly Recorded Interviews," Nieman Reports, XXXIX (Spring 1985): 17-20.
- "Common Sense and the Education of Young Journalists," by Theodore L. Glasser and James S. Ettema. Journalism Educator, 44 (Summer 1989): 18-25, 75
- "Communication and the Cultivation of Citizenship," Communication, 12 (Spring 1991): 235-248.
- "When the Facts Don't Speak for Themselves: A Study of the Use of Irony in Daily Journalism," by Theodore L. Glasser and James S. Ettema, Critical Studies in Mass Communication, 10 (December 1993): 322-338.
- “Play and the Power of News,” Journalism: Theory, Practice and Criticism, 1 (April 2000): 23-29.
- “The Politics of Public Journalism,” Journalism Studies, 1 (November 2000): 683-686.
- “The Motives for Studying Journalism,” Journalism Studies, (2001) 2, 4: 623-627.
- “The Campus Press and Pernicious Speech: The Case Against Stupid Advertisements,” Journalism & Mass Communication Educator, 59 (Spring 2004): 17-23.
- “Ethics and Eloquence in Journalism: An Approach to Press Accountability,” by Theodore L. Glasser and James S. Ettema, Journalism Studies, 9 (August 2008): 512-534.
- “The Claims of Multiculturalism and Journalism's Promise of Diversity,” by Theodore L. Glasser, Isabel Awad, and John W. Kim. Journal of Communication, 59 (2009): 57-78.
- “The Privatization of Press Ethics,” Journalism Studies, 15, 6 (2014): 699-703.
