= Zwitter =

Zwitter is the German word for "hybrid" or "hermaphrodite". It may refer to:

- A zwitterion, in chemistry
- An intersex person, in Karl Heinrich Ulrichs' Uranian typology
- A song on the Rammstein album Mutter
