= Hybrid-origin =

Hybrid-origin may refer to:

- Multiregional hypothesis
- Archaic human admixture with modern humans
- the "hybrid-origin theory" of Stan Gooch, published in the 1970s

== See also ==
- Hybridisation (disambiguation)
