= Kaarle Nordenstreng =

Finnish sociologist and media scholar (born 1941)

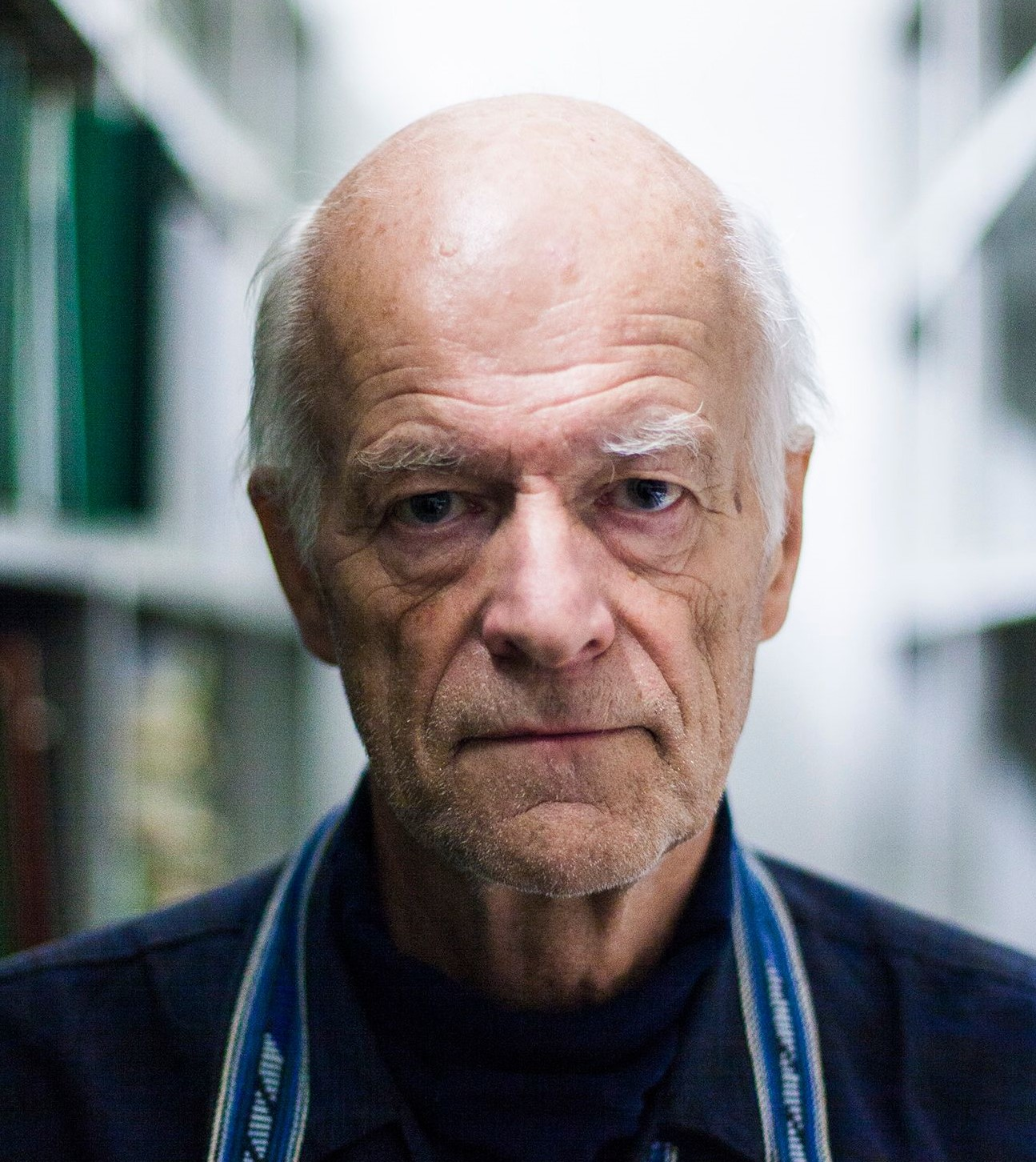
Kaarle Nordenstreng in 2015

Kaarle Tapani Jorma Johannes Magnus Bertel Nordenstreng (born June 9, 1941) is a Finnish media scholar. He is Professor Emeritus of Journalism and Mass Communication at the Tampere University.

== Life ==
Kaarle Nordenstreng studied psychology at the University of Helsinki, gaining a PhD in 1969. He joined the faculty of the University of Tampere in 1965, and became head of research at the Finnish Broadcasting Company in 1967. In 1971 he was appointed Professor of Journalism and Mass Communication at the University of Tampere. From 1971 to 1976 he was a Member of the UNESCO Panel of Consultants on Communication Research. From 1972 to 1978 he was Vice-President of the International Association For Media And Communication Research (IAMCR). From 1976 to 1990 he was President of the International Organization of Journalists (IOJ). He was Honorary Professor at Saint Petersburg State University in 2008, and Moscow University in 2009.

== Publications ==
Most notable books in English:

- (with Tapio Varis) Television Traffic - a One-way Street?: A Survey and Analysis of the International Flow of Television Programme Material. UNESCO, 1974
- (ed. with Herbert Schiller) National Sovereignty and International Communication, 1979
- (with Lauri Hannikainen) The Mass Media Declaration of UNESCO, 1984
- (ed. with George Gerbner and Hamid Mowlana) The Global Media Debate: Its Rise, Fall, and Renewal, 1991
- (ed. with Herbert Schiller) Beyond National Sovereignty: International Communication in the 1990s, 1992
- (ed. with Richard Vincent and Michael Traber) Towards Equity in Global Communication: MacBride Update, 1999
- (ed. with Michael Griffin) International Media Monitoring, 1999.
- (ed. with Elena Vartanova and Yassen Zassoursky) Russian Media Challenge, 2001
- (with Clifford G. Christians, Theodore L. Glasser, Denis McQuail and Robert A. White) Normative Theories of the Media: Journalism in Democratic Societies, 2009
- (ed. with Clifford G. Christians) Communication Theories in a Multicultural World, 2014
- (ed. with Daya Thussu) Mapping BRICS Media, 2015
- (with Ulf Jonas Björk, Frank Beyersdorf, Svennik Høyer and Epp Lauk) A History of the International Movement of Journalists: Professionalism Versus Politics, 2016
- (ed. with Daya Thussu) BRICS Reshaping the Global Communication Order, 2021
- (with Cees Hamelink) Basics of IAMCR History, 2022
- (ed.) Coverage of the Russia-Ukraine War by Television News in Nine Countries, 2023
