= Hybrid language =

Hybrid language may refer to:

- A multi-paradigm programming language, a programming language that draws on elements from more than one programming paradigm, in computer science
- In natural language, a mixed language deriving from several languages simultaneously
- Any result of language contact

== See also ==
- Hybrid (disambiguation)
