= Transformation processes (media systems) =

The term transformation (also "transition" or "system change") in the field of mediated cross-border communication refers to a media system's change from for instance authoritarian or communist structures to a new media system with different structures and control mechanisms.

Compared to the studies of media systems, transformation research is focused on the collective and individual actors who "demand, support, and manage change". They can be found in governments, parties, NGOs, civil society organizations or interest groups. To the largest extent, transformation research addresses change from authoritarian to democratic media systems. Since transformation processes in media systems are always linked to the political and socioeconomic development, transformation research is not solely focused on the transformation of the media systems, but also on sectors like politics, economy, society, or culture.

Transformation research is a comparative approach, since processes in different stages of the political or media system are compared. The approach is highly complex, because it combines comparison with the dimension of space and time, for instance by analyzing similar change processes of media systems in different world regions and times in history. This causes problems, because the changing systems can exhibit considerable differences between one another. Although there are differences between them, transformation processes often occur at the same time and significant similarities between the resulting patterns can be observed.

== Interrelation between transformation processes of political and media systems ==
The transformation research on media systems has its origin in transformation studies of political sciences. Fragments of political science theories were applied in comparative media studies, since transformation processes of media systems are strongly connected to the transformation of political systems. Katharina Hadamik (2003) describes this connection as "political-medial transformation-parallelism". She stresses that the media system in a state cannot take any path of transformation. It is connected to the transformation of the political system. For instance, states which develop democratic structures and constitutional conditions in their political system also build out free or relatively free media systems. In contrast, media systems in states with weaker or even no transformation of the political system have much higher barriers of development to overcome. So, "it is the political system that ultimately has the power to make binding decisions and thus shapes the basic structure and functioning of the media system". This strong connection between political and media system can be emphasized by observing the process of transformation from an authoritarian to a democratic system in both politics and media.

The transformation from an authoritarian to a democratic political system has three phases:

Phase 1: end of the old authoritarian regime

Phase 2: transformation and institutionalisation of democracy

Phase 3: consolidation of democracy through a new system

The process of transformation from an authoritarian to a democratic media system also has three phases, similar to the phases of transformation in political systems:

Phase 1: breakthrough in the media sector

Phase 2: fixation of the changes in the media sector

Phase 3: development of a stable media system

== Types of transformation processes ==
In comparative media system research, scholars have identified three processes of change in media systems: homogenization, heterogenization, and hybridization.

=== Homogenization towards one model of media systems ===
In the field of comparative media system research, homogenization is defined as the convergence of many media systems towards one specific model, caused by changes in political and economic structures, commercialization, and changes in technology. Cultural differences between the countries are said to become less important, since a few international conglomerates dominate the global media industry. In 2004, the authors Hallin and Mancini attested a convergence of European media systems towards the Liberal Media System prevalent in North America, the United Kingdom and Ireland. Relating to the convergence of media systems, four constitutive factors can be identified:

- Americanization: The changing organizational structures and behaviors within the media are heading towards patterns first established in the United States. Moreover, the US American model of politically neutral and professional journalism is becoming more and more influential for other media systems. The journalistic education of the United States has said to have been a strong influence on journalism cultures worldwide.
- Technological change: New technologies can lead to adaptations by individuals and social institutions, for instance assuming new communication procedures associated with the new technology. These effects often produce common practices across different social contexts. The development of professional journalism is also connected to technological change.
- Secularization: The term secularization describes "the separation of citizens from attachments of religious and ideological 'faiths,' and the decline of institutions based on these faiths". This separation results in a decline of political parties, since they are connected to ideologies and particular social milieus. Hence, secularization leads media systems towards the Liberal Model.
- Commercialization: Commercialization can be seen as the most important force of homogenization. It has changed the print media as well as the electronic media. The transition of European broadcasting systems, from predominantly public service systems in the 1970s to a system with commercial domination today, gave the strongest impetus for homogenization. Thus, commercialization decreases the ties of media system and political system.

Although a tendency of homogenization towards the Liberal Model can be attested, there still are important differences between the systems. First of all, the variations between the political systems of each country seem to persist in the future. Furthermore, the party and electoral systems between the countries remain different. Moreover, the legal systems of the countries are still distinct. Also, even though there is a trend towards neutral journalism, political parallelism in the national press of Democratic Corporatist countries still persists and will probably remain in the immediate future. Thus, a complete converge of the media systems seems unlikely.

There are also limits and countertendencies against homogenization. There is evidence of countertendencies relating to the reduction of political polarization and ideological differences between parties. In some countries, new extremist parties on the far right of the political spectrum arose, motivated through issues of immigration, multiculturalism and integration. Moreover, so called advocacy journalism does not only persist in Polarized Pluralist countries (especially in Italy, Spain and Greece), but new forms of it are also beginning to proliferate in all kinds of media systems.

=== Heterogenization of media systems ===
Some scholars argue against the theory of homogenization of media systems that due to national political cultures and institutions, a process of heterogenization rather than homogenization, has to be stated. The countertendencies of homogenization (for instance new right extremist parties, new forms of advocacy journalism, divergence processes in the styles of election coverage between the United States and Great Britain) lead to heterogenization of the media systems. However, the divergence of media systems is confronted by a much more fundamental convergence between them. Hallin & Mancini also argue that the results of their analysis do not support the thesis of heterogenization of media systems.

=== Hybridization of media systems ===
Hybrid media systems are defined as a blend of already existing practices and new practices from a new or foreign media system. Foreign models are adapted to the particular historical, geographical, social, and cultural characteristics of the domestic media system. Rather than a temporary state of transformation, hybrid media systems are considered an equilibrium between two types of practices. Thus, hybrid media systems are mostly located between authoritarian and democratic political systems. Although they may have introduced competitive elections, they may not strengthen further democratic institutions beyond the basic requirements. Therefore, the degree to which hybrid systems adopt democratic practices can vary from state to state. Hybrid systems build out distinct patterns of politic-media relations with significant differences to Western media systems, for instance the Brazilian media system, which was influenced by the American journalism model. However, the American journalism system was not adopted one-to-one, since there "was no solid market economy, individualistic culture, or political culture that valued the freedom of press". Another example is the media system of Poland, which detached itself from its communist ties in the 1990s and converged towards Western media systems, but still has its Polish specifics, such as the use of public-service broadcasting as a political instrument.

According to the three phases from an authoritarian to a democratic media system, the old authoritarian system ends by the institutionalisation of democratic elements (phase 1 and 2). In the third phase, the new hybrid system consolidates democratic elements, but some elements of the authoritarian system still exist. Thus, it is difficult to state when the third phase is completed.

In Hallin & Mancini's Comparing media systems beyond the western world (2012), which gives an overview of criticism about their framework of 2004 and furthermore extends and revises it, Katrin Voltmer states that, instead of media system homogenization towards the Liberal Model of Hallin & Mancini's framework, transformation processes rather move towards hybrid media systems, since media markets become more international, but have to adapt to local situations. Thus, the theory of hybridization in media systems is rather an adaption than a counterpart to the theory of convergence.

== Outlook ==
A consistent transformation theory valid for all transformation processes and countries, does not yet exist, since it is difficult to cover the variety and complexity of all the processes. Some researchers are of the opinion that it is impossible to find a consistent theory of transformation processes, because of the historical, political and social particularities of each country and their different types of transformation processes. Furthermore, the debate about convergence, divergence, or hybridization of media systems is still ongoing.

== See also ==
- Media studies
- Political communication
- Mediated cross-border communication
- Political parallelism
- Comparing Media Systems: Three Models of Media and Politics
