= European public sphere =

The European public sphere refers to the public sphere where ideas and information are exchanged by citizens of European societies that can influence the European political life (especially that of the European Union). It is to have an "arena for EU-wide public discourse".

The European public sphere is incomplete and mostly consists of several attempts to create arenas for EU-wide public discourse. Proponents of the debate around the EU's democratic deficit considered the lack of European public sphere as one of the reasons behind this deficit. A fully-fledged European public sphere would provide citizens with the necessary information to participate in the political life of the EU, enable them to scrutinize and discuss political actions and to feed the development of the European citizenship.

== Definition ==
The public sphere is defined by Jürgen Habermas as a space "made up of private people gathered together as a public and articulating the needs of society with the state". This public space allows for different opinions to be expressed, problems to be discussed and collective solutions to be developed. The public sphere is a place of debates that Silke Adam identifies as the "link between politicians and citizens, which can be strengthened by the media"

The ideology behind the public sphere theory is that governments' actions, and their legitimacy, come from the views expressed in the public sphere. The discussions around this theory include the structure of the public sphere, the role of mass media, and what influence the public sphere has over political action and social life. Theorists of the European integration point out toward a democratic deficit within the EU, that is the gap that lies between the European institutions and the general public. They argue that the democratic void is partly due to the absence of a political community defined by a shared European identity (i.e., a common public sphere).

== A shifting concept ==
According to Corinne Doria, the European public sphere and its characteristic have been the subject of many debates since the 1950s and the beginning of the European integration. It has been considered as having always existed, currently being under formation or impossible to achieve. Those who argue that the European public sphere has been in construction since the 1950s support their thesis by referring to the constant European integration with the elaboration of the single market, which is being more and more integrated, the successive enlargements, the increased given space to European news in national media, and the Eurovision.

According to that idea, Doria suggests that the European public sphere is not a state per se but a process and only when this process is completed, European integration will be achieved as well. However, as she goes on, four approaches are opposing in the debate when it comes to the creation of a European public sphere. The first approach is that European public sphere has existed before, since the Middle Ages, in the form of communication networks between European scholars, artists, or diplomats. The second approach is that it has never existed and can only exist in the limitations of the nation-states. The third approach is that it has not existed but will exist eventually. The final approach is that it does not exist, and because of lack of necessary preconditions such as the use of common language, it will never exist.

A panel of experts chaired by Hakan G. Sicakkan and Slavko Splichal reflected on the four mainstream models to explain the formation of a European public sphere". Those models are:

- Europeanization of national public spheres: national public spheres are progressively increasing the share of European topics that are discussed.
- Domestication of Europe: absorption of Europe at the domestic level. It is the adaptation of European topics within the domestic public sphere.
- Expanding overlaps between national public spheres.
- Increasing interconnectedness between national public spheres.

According to them, these four models show that national public spheres will gradually diminish and be replaced by a pan-European public sphere through one of those four process. However, they find that the dominant model is the one supporting the Europeanization of national public spheres, in line with Doria's findings.

== The role of media ==
In his theory, Jürgen Habermas argues that the public sphere requires "specific means for transmitting information and influencing those who receive it" In other words, media are essential to constitute and maintain a public sphere. For instance, a study by S. Edgerly et al. shows that new mass media such as social networks like YouTube can be used as platform to support a public sphere. Thanks to the wide range of voices which can be expressed, its ability to reach out to the masses, to propose social and political contents, YouTube can be viewed as a relevant online space for public discussion.

A 2015 study by Jaco Groshek and Ahmed Al-Rawi supports these findings. By analyzing online protests against austerity measures during the European economic crisis, they conclude that with the movements being transnational, a form of European public sphere appeared for a period of time. This study showed a growing interest for European issues, even if it's brief and on specific topics. For J. Gerhards, this growing interest framed in a European perspective rather than a national one is crucial for the formation of a European public sphere.

However, one of the many issues the idea of a European public sphere is facing is its elitism. As argued by Adam Silke, only the people interested in the EU — mostly people educated and already familiar with the complexity of the EU — will use these media. He states that while national public opinions are more Europeanized today, it is mostly true for elites. Consequently, Michael Brüggeman and Hagen Schulz-Forberg find that the audience of transnational media (such as Arte) in Europe is small but influential. This leaves the question to whether this audience could help fill the gap between the EU and European citizens to create a European public sphere. This could be achieved in two different but complementary ways: the Europeanization of national media and the development of transnational media.

=== Development of transnational media ===
Brüggeman and Schulz-Forberg argue that pan-regional media are the type of transnational media that can contribute the most to a European public sphere. One example is Euronews which has an increasing audience, broadcasting in thirteen different languages and reaching 400 million households in 155 countries. Another example is the website EurActiv.com which discusses about European issues. But it not considered as well known outside of people already familiar with said issues.

=== Europeanization of national media ===
This refers to the increasing coverage of European issues within national public spheres. This raises the question to whether or not national media have increased the share of EU news in their coverage over time. For instance, in 2016, authors have analyzed the content of various media in EU countries and found that national media attention for the EU's growth and jobs strategy is limited and that it doesn't increase over time. However, they also emphasized transnational dimensions in the coverage as countries reference to each other in a benchmarking spirit.

They concluded that media coverage of the EU4s socio-economic strategy is Europeanized but found that the debate is only made by and for people already interested in the EU. They also drew a lesson for the European public sphere: the EU related dimensions are often dropped by national media which frame information according to national concerns.

== Pan-European social movements and protests ==
Inside a proper public sphere, citizens can use the repertoire of protests and political actions to voice their concerns regarding political actions. In the case of the European public sphere, European citizens should be able to address their concerns about the European integration. In their paper, Maria Trif and Doug Imig argue that the development of a "realm of contentious political engagement with European policies appears to be part of the process of building Europe". They find that a broad range of actors (NGOs, trade unions, federations of workers and/or companies) use the repertoire of contentious politics to voice their demands. This can be viewed as the temporary establishment of a pan-European public sphere. However, the life of these European public spaces only lasts as long as the protest does.

A concrete example of a pan-European social movement momentarily creating a proper European public space is the TTIP protest. The Transatlantic Trade and Investment Partnership (TTIP) was a proposed trade agreement between the EU and the United States, with the aim of promoting trade and multilateral economic growth. Several controversies came to life around the TTIP negotiations. Among those controversies, there is the secrecy of negotiations, the lack of transparency, its relative effect on the European economy and the high number of classified contents. Many groups criticized the agreement which resulted in social protests by unions, NGOs and environmentalists' groups. These critics mainly targeted the undemocratic nature of the trade agreement, its impact on the environment and the threat it generates for the European social models as it would have put European workers in competition with Americans.

In 2014, an online consultation conducted by the European Commission received more than 150 000 responses and 97% were provided by activists. A self-organized European Citizens' Initiative against TTIP and CETA gathered around 3.2 million signatures within a year. As the negotiations were dropped, the initiative was later withdrawn. The example of TTIP shows how European protests can structure themselves on the basis of already existing organizations. These social movements use a wide range of tools: institutional with the European Citizens' Initiative or petitions, physical protests... Furthermore, it shows how social protests manage to create ad hoc pan-European public spaces to voice opinion and debate relevant subjects of the EU integration.

== European elections and transnational lists ==
The European elections held to elect the direct representatives of the European citizens are often considered as 'second-order' elections, in the sense that citizens give the priority to national elections. This can be illustrated by the results. However, we witness a gradual increase in the interest of the citizens for the European elections. The interest of citizens for the elections which are arguably one of the most important events for political debates at the EU level teaches us more about the state of the European public sphere. Therefore, by taking the example of the elections to explain the development of such sphere, obstacles are immediately apparent.

One of the main issues is the domestication of European political campaigns as observers find a dominance of domestic issues over European ones. According to the European Parliament report, only a fifth of the campaigns in Europe are centred on Europe topics. The European parliament tried to harmonize national electoral rules, but it had little impact since most were not implemented for the 2019 elections. as only few Member states followed the proposals to increase the visibility of European political parties in the national campaign. One of the examples of the ways that can increase the visibility of European political parties in the national campaigns in member states is to ensure the logos and the names of the European parties to be visible on the national ballot papers, but few member states of the EU implement this proposal. In the paper by Boomgaarden and de Vreese, they found that national political actors are still dominating news media across the European Union, and European issues are still framed through national viewpoints.

Among the current debate on how to increase the 'Europeanness' of the elections, there is the idea to introduce transnational lists. This idea refers to the multiple debates and proposals from European and national actors to feature lists of candidates selected by transnational actors instead of national actors for the European elections. The most prominent proposal comes from the 'Duff report' elaborated by the former British MEP (Member of European Parliament) Andrew Duff. In his report, he suggests that each elector would be enabled to cast one vote for the EU-wide list in addition to their vote for the national or regional list. His hope was to add 25 transnationally elected MEPs from the (back then) already existing poll of 751, for the 2014 elections, an idea that was eventually abandoned.
