= Hybridisation =

Hybridization (or hybridisation) may refer to:

- Hybridization (biology), the process of combining different varieties of organisms to create a hybrid
- Orbital hybridization, in chemistry, the mixing of atomic orbitals into new hybrid orbitals
- Nucleic acid hybridization, the process of joining two complementary strands of nucleic acids: RNA, DNA or oligonucleotides
- In evolutionary algorithms, the merging two or more optimization techniques into a single algorithm
  - Memetic algorithm, a common template for hybridization
- In linguistics, the process of one variety blending with another variety
- The alteration of a vehicle into a hybrid electric vehicle
- In globalization theory, the ongoing blending of cultures
- Hybridization in political election campaign communication, the combining of campaign techniques developed in different countries
- In paleoanthropology, the hypothesis of Neanderthal and human hybridization

== See also ==
- Hybrid (disambiguation)
- Hybridity
