= Hybrid vehicle (disambiguation) =

A hybrid vehicle is a vehicle which uses a mixture of power or fuel sources.

Hybrid vehicle may also refer to:

- Dual-mode vehicle, a hybrid vehicle which uses power from two sources of the same type
- Flexible-fuel vehicle, a hybrid vehicle which can use more than one type of liquid fuel for its internal combustion engine
- Hybrid bicycle, a bicycle with features from both road bikes and mountain bikes
- Hybrid electric vehicle, automobiles (cars) which employ both a traditional internal combustion engine and an electric battery motor/generator to provide motive force and energy recovery
  - Mild hybrid
  - Full hybrid
  - Plug-in hybrid, an electric hybrid vehicle that can be plugged into a power grid to recharge its battery
- Hybrid motorcycle, a motorcycle built using components from more than one original-manufacturer products, such as TriBSA
- Hybrid rocket, a rocket motor using propellants from two different states of matter
- Hybrid train, a locomotive with more than one power source
- Hybrid velomobile, an enclosed human-powered vehicle with an auxiliary (usually electric) motor
- Hydraulic hybrid, a hybrid vehicle which employs both a traditional internal combustion engine and a hydraulic motor/pump to provide motive force and energy recovery
- Motorized bicycle, a bicycle powered by human and another power source such as liquid fuels or electricity
