= Jay Blumler =

American academic (1924–2021)

- Born: 18 February 1924
- Died: 30 January 2021 (aged 96)
- Occupation: Researcher

Academic background
- Education: University of Oxford (DPhil)

Academic work
- Discipline: Communications
- Sub-discipline: Political Communication
- Institutions: University of Leeds

Jay G Blumler (18 February 1924 – 30 January 2021 (aged 96)) was an American-British researcher of communication, politics and media. He was Professor of Public Communication at the University of Leeds.

== Early life and education ==
Blumler was born in New York, New York on 18 February 1924. Blumler's father was a Marxist and his mother a supporter of Roosevelt's New Deal. He described himself as a "red diaper baby".

In 1947 Blumler graduated from Antioch College, Ohio with the degree of BA in political science. He subsequently received a DPhil from the University of Oxford.

== Military service ==
Blumler joined the United States Army in 1944 and served as a Russian interpreter in Berlin during the Second World War. As Chair of the American Veterans Committee in Berlin he was invited to have tea with Eleanor Roosevelt when she visited the city. She had heard of some of the charity work that his committee had done and asked to meet them.

== Academic career ==
From 1949 Blumler taught political theory at Ruskin College, Oxford. In 1963 he was appointed Granada Television Research Fellow at the University of Leeds where in 1966 he established the Centre for Television Research. He became the university's first Professor of Public Communication in 1978.

Blumler retired from his chair at Leeds in 1989 with the title Emeritus Professor. He continued to publish prolifically as well as teaching for one semester each year at the University of Maryland.

== Death ==
Blumler died in Leeds on 30 January 2021, aged 96. He was survived by his children Matthew, Luke, Jackie and Mark. His wife, Gina, died in 2004.

== Selected publications ==
- Television in Politics: Its Uses and Influences (1968) with Denis McQuail
- The Uses of Mass Communications: Current Perspectives on Gratifications Research (1974) editor with Elihu Katz
- The Challenge of Election Broadcasting. Report of an Enquiry by the Centre for Television Research, University of Leeds (1978) with Michael Gurevitch and Julian Ives
- La télévision fait-elle l'élection?: Une analyse comparative, France, Grande-Bretagne, Belgique (1978) with Alison Ewbank and Claude Geerts
- Communicating to Voters: Television in the First European Parliamentary Elections (1983) editor with Anthony D. Fox
- Research on the Range and Quality of Broadcasting Services. A Report for the Committee on Financing the BBC.(HMSO 1986) with Thomas Nossiter, Malcolm Brynin
- Wired Cities: Shaping the Future of Communications (1987) editor with William H. Dutton and Kenneth L. Kramer
- Broadcasting Finance in Transition: A Comparative Handbook (1991) editor with T. J. Nossiter
- The Formation of Campaign Agendas: A Comparative Analysis of Party and Media Roles in Recent American and British Elections (1991) with Michael Gurevitch, Holli A. Semetko, David H. Weaver
- Comparatively Speaking: Communication and Culture across Space and Time (1992) editor with Jack M. McLeod, Karl Erik Rosengren
- Television and the Public Interest: Vulnerable Values in Western European Broadcasting (1992) editor
- The Crisis of Public Communication (1995) with Michael Gurevitch
