= Hybrid tea =

Hybrid tea may refer to:

- Any hybrid of tea (Camellia sinensis) with other related plants (e.g. C. sasanqua)
- The Hybrid tea rose cultivar group
