= Political parallelism =

Interaction between politics and media

Political parallelism is a feature of media systems. In comparative media system research, it "refers to the character of links between political actors and the media and more generally the extent to which media reflects political divisions." Daniel C. Hallin and Paolo Mancini used the term to analyse links between media organizations and political tendencies; appropriating an older concept by Colin Seymour-Ure who had originally applied it in a narrower way to the links between the press and political parties.

The term was defined in Daniel C. Hallin and Paolo Mancini’s Comparing Media Systems in 2004. The authors analysed media systems according to four dimensions: the development of a mass press, political parallelism, professionalization of journalists, and state intervention. According to these four dimensions, media systems were then categorised into three ideal models, the Polarized Pluralist Model, the Liberal Model and the Democratic Corporatist media system.

There are five factors indicating a media system’s degree of political parallelism:

	Factor	Example
1	The extent to which media reflects distinct political orientations and allegiances, and the orientation and professional practice of journalists.	Chris Smith is a journalist and works for the newspaper The Timeline. In his spare time, he visits meetings of the National Workers’ Party. He likes their stance, so he writes favourable articles on their election manifesto.
2	Organizational links between media and political parties or organizations.	Tanya Smith is a local politician. As a second job, she writes articles for a local newspaper.
3	The involvement of media personnel as former political actors.	After his retirement as town major, Elias Smith decides to write articles for the local newspaper, explaining current political developments from his point of view.
4	Whether the career advancement of media personnel is dependent on political affiliations.	Jennifer Smith is a young journalist. She knows that it will be difficult for her to further her career without meeting "the right people", so she joins the government’s party.
5	The media audiences’ partisanship.	Andrew Smith is a grocer. He buys the Daily Newspaper every day, because he almost always agrees with how they interpret current events.

== History ==
In 2004, when Daniel C. Hallin and Paolo Mancini introduced the concept of political parallelism, they applied it to Western consolidated capitalist democracies. It refers to media content and the extent to which different media reflect distinct political orientations in their output.

Historically, political advocacy was seen as an important function of the print media emerging in the late 18th to early 19th century. Political parties or other political actors established newspapers and supported them. The role of the journalist was to influence the public towards his or her political faction or cause, something which changed only in the 19th century when journalism norms moved towards the ideal of neutrality in reporting.

Then, commercialization became an important force in the newspaper business. Papers no longer depended on patronage of political parties or actors, but adopted a more "balanced" line. According to Jonathan Hardy newspapers could, by de-aligning themselves from politics and moving towards "objectivity", "reach an aggregated consumer audience that was not fractured along political lines. [...] Overall, the economic rationale was that, with less bias, more readers would be attracted to a paper."

After the First World War, this changed again, when political conflict was reflected in the news and "strong political polarization enhanced demand for overtly political papers." However, the extent of this development differed in strength in different media systems. In "Democratic Corporatist" media systems strong ties between the media and political institutions continued until the 1970s. In Polarized Pluralist systems, political parallelism in the press played a key role in the national development, for example in Spain and Italy. Even today, as Angelika W. Wyka argues about Italy and Greece, "although the existing ethical codes are greatly thought to be a reflection of objective and impartial reporting, journalists [...] tend to be somewhat, if not extremely, partisan." In Central Eastern Europe, "highly opinionated and politically-driven journalism also prevails."

As mentioned before, political parallelism is expressed in the partisanship of media audiences, too, when supporters of different parties buy different newspapers catering for their opinions and political preferences. In Germany, for instance, the daily newspaper Die Welt is seen as more conservative than the liberal Süddeutsche Zeitung, with die tageszeitung further to the left. In Spain, the newspaper El País had most readers among the voters of the Spanish Socialist Workers Party (PSOE), ABC is read widely among people voting for the People's Party (PP), and El Mundo predominantly by non-voters.

== Related concepts ==
Closely related to the concept of political parallelism is the distinction between internal and external pluralism. These two concepts refer to the media’s way of handling diversity in political loyalties and orientations. External pluralism is achieved at the level of the media system as a whole, when media outlets’ and organisations’ content reflect different points of views within society. Internal pluralism is achieved within one medium, when it attempts to report neutrally and balanced, and avoids affiliations with political groups. Media systems with a high degree of external pluralism will also have a high degree of political parallelism, whereas media systems with a high degree of internal pluralism will have a low level of political parallelism.

Typical examples for media systems with a relatively high degree of political parallelism include the aforementioned Spain, and also Greece, Portugal and France (Polarized Pluralist media systems), Germany, Austria, Switzerland, the Netherlands and the Scandinavian states (Democratic Corporatist media systems). Typical examples for media systems with a relatively low degree of political parallelism include the United States, Canada, and Ireland (Liberal media systems).

A high degree of political parallelism does not necessarily point to a compromised democracy. Polarized Pluralist media systems, for instance, are characterized by a lively public sphere, high voter turnout, strong citizen-party attachment and political participation.

== Criticism ==
As a seminal study on the topic of media system comparison, Hallin and Mancini’s 2004 book has been discussed so extensively that in 2012, they published a new book presenting a collection of criticism. Comparing Media Systems Beyond the Western World addresses the main issues and concerns that authors have expressed between 2004 and 2012, with special regards to the framework's extension to non-Western systems. Criticism on the concept of political parallelism in particular relates to the fact that the scope of Hallin and Mancini’s concept is only applicable to countries with different political parties or groups.

In her 2012 paper How Far Can Media Systems Travel? Applying Hallin and Mancini’s Comparative Framework outside the Western World, Katrin Voltmer discussed and criticised Hallin and Mancini’s work with special regards to methodology and its inapplicability to non-Western countries. She also addresses the issue of political parallelism. In non-Western media systems, politics are not shaped by ideological distinctions between left and right. Political conflict is created by antagonising religious, ethnical, or regional identities. Polarization between these factors in the political systems of non-Western states, according to Voltmer, leads to conflicts whose structures are different from the right-left distinction of European history.

To adapt the concept of political parallelism to non-Western states, she suggests splitting it into three more narrow categories matching three different political situations:

- "Polarized pluralism" denotes antagonism between two opposing camps or political, ethnic, regional or religious identities (for example the conflict between Protestants and Catholics in Northern Ireland).
- "Fragmented Pluralism" denotes that political contest is fragmented into many smaller groups of similar dominance (as was the case, for example, in Yugoslav federalism).
- "Hegemonic Pluralism" denotes that one camp or party continuously dominates the conflict (for example, the African National Congress (ANC) in South Africa).

These three categories do have differing dynamics for the political process, and thus, the media system.

Yuezhi Zhao, another contributor to Comparing Media Systems Beyond the Western World, proposed a different measure to adapt political parallelism to non-Western media systems, in this case to China. In her article Understanding China’s Media System in a World Historical Context, she states that the concept is difficult to apply because of China’s one-party-predominance, which differentiates it from multi-party democracies with political pluralism. In China’s case, the Chinese Communist Party (CCP) does own shares of the news media, and most of the press is affiliated with the party structurally, so that China’s media system can be described as a "media as mouthpiece" system with party-press parallelism.

Afonso de Albuquerque proposes to assess political parallelism in media systems very differently. Applying Hallin and Mancini’s framework to the media system in Brazil, which did not undergo commercialization processes in the 19th and 20th century, but only relatively late, he proposes a new role for the media in his article On Models and Margins – Comparative Media Models Viewed from a Brazilian Perspective. As a political agent, he argues, there are four types of media-politics relationships:

- "Polarized Pluralist", in which party lines are clear, and the media politically active (comparable to Hallin and Mancini’s Polarized Pluralist media system)
- "Media as Political Agent", with a moderating role, in which party lines are relatively unclear, but the media politically active (as is the case in Brazil)
- "Public Service Media", where party lines are clear but the media relatively passive in political reporting (comparable to Hallin& Mancini’s Democratic Corporatist media system)
- "Objective Media", which is politically passive and transports unclear party lines.

In Brazil, argues de Albuquerque, the media acts as apolitical agent partaking in the political debate, but not as an advocate of political parties.

== Adaptations ==
In the concluding chapter of Comparing Media Systems Beyond the Western World, Hallin and Mancini summarise the discussions around various aspects of the media system theory they proposed in 2004, adapting their framework to apply to media systems beyond the Western world. With regards to political parallelism, Hallin and Mancini propose to split the concept into two, following Afonso de Albuquerque's suggestion. They propose the terms "external pluralism", to refer to the tendency of different media outlets to express different partisan tendencies, and "political activity", the media's tendency to intervene in political debate and influence events at all.
