= Comparing Media Systems =

2004 work by Daniel C. Hallin and Paolo Mancini

Comparing Media Systems: Three Models of Media and Politics
- Author: Daniel C. Hallin, Paolo Mancini
- Language: English
- Subject: politics, comparative analysis, media systems
- Publisher: Cambridge University Press
- Publication date: 2004
- Publication place: United States
- Media type: Paperback
- Pages: 342
- ISBN: 978-0521543088
- OCLC: 443366685
- Dewey Decimal: 302.23

Comparing Media Systems: Three Models of Media and Politics (2004), by Daniel C. Hallin and Paolo Mancini, is a seminal study in the field of international comparative media system research. The study compares media systems of 18 Western democracies including nine Northern European countries (Austria, Belgium, Denmark, Finland, Germany, the Netherlands, Norway, Sweden, and Switzerland), five Southern European countries (France, Greece, Italy, Portugal, and Spain) and four Atlantic countries (Canada, Great Britain, Ireland, and the United States).

The conceptual framework developed in this study turned out to be an important contribution to the field of the comparative media systems research because it provides a systematic and applicable approach to analyze differences and similarities of the relationships between media and politics.

Since the publication of Hallin and Mancini's book in 2004, there has been academic discussion with regards to the adequacy of their suggested framework for understanding variations between different systems around the world, located within different cultural, social, and/or political contexts. As a consequence, there has been further progression within the field of comparative media system research.

== Contextualization ==
=== Comparative media system research ===
The field of comparative media system research has a long tradition reaching back to the study Four Theories of the Press by Siebert, Peterson and Schramm from 1956. This book was the origin of the academic debate on comparing and classifying media systems, whereas it was normatively biased and strongly influenced by the ideologies of the Cold War era. Though this approach has often been criticized (e.g. because of its ethnocentricity, inconsistent structure, questionable typologies, or its scant empirical basis of the analysis), it was a starting point for following normative media theories and the development of the field.

Comparative media system research has been subject to several changes since its establishment. The number of categories to describe media systems grew and approaches got more complex. Another trend is that researchers factor in political systems more intensively to explain and compare media systems. A more fundamental development is the shift from normative to empirically based approaches.

There are still problems of comparative media studies in various countries which must be faced. The validity of the country sampling procedure is one problem, beside the adequate definition of the scope of the comparison to meet the specific national features of the cases, and the definition of adequate indicators as the basis for the comparison. Additionally, the developed models are still relatively static not being able to describe changes adequately, and online media have been largely neglected though their importance has been increasing since the late 1990s.

However, comparative media system studies are an important instrument for contemporary communication phenomena under study. The comparative design is a bridge between traditional and nation-centered studies of media systems and new media as well as globalization perspectives. Jakubowicz points out that contemporarily comparative media system analyses are seen as the key approach to understand globalization processes of the media.

=== Systematic classification of the approach ===
Comparative media system research is one possible approach to study transnational and border-crossing communication processes worldwide. A very useful and heuristic systematization of the vast field of transnational and border-crossing communication comes from Wessler and Brüggemann (2012) (see also Dimensions of analysis). According to this heuristic, the approach from Hallin and Mancini can be identified and localized as one specific combination of the components along these three dimensions of analysis. Their perspective of analysis is focused on a systematic comparison of media systems within Western democracies. Consequently, their level of analysis concentrates on media systems within the context of nation states. Their main objectives are media-politics relations primarily on the level of structures, but in addition to it, they consider all objects of analysis to gain an encompassing understanding of these relations.

== Objectives ==
Developing a unifying conceptual framework for comparing media systems was essential for Hallin and Mancini. They focused on theory building rather than testing theories, as the then prevailing Four Theories of the Press and its subsequent normative modifications showed deficiencies in adequately analyzing present media systems. Consequently, Hallin and Mancini focused on an empirical “by treating these systems not as abstract ideals but as concrete social formations that developed under particular historical conditions.” Hallin and Mancini initially chose a “most similar systems”-design – that is, comparing systems which are quite similar according to their structures and functioning to understand in which aspects they differ from each other to discover specific characteristics of each single system. Following this design, they conceptualized dimensions containing particular variables to analyze similarities and differences between the 18 countries under study. Their objective was to find more or less coherent patterns within their sample which could possibly be condensed into ideal types in terms of Max Weber’s conception of ideal types. Since the dimensions and the resulting models cover specifically the media-politics relations of the Western world, Hallin and Mancini do not claim universal validity of their framework. Hence, it must be reconceptualized to meet the specific conditions of media-politics relations beyond the Western world.

== Hallin and Mancini’s framework ==
Hallin and Mancini's conceptual framework consists of the four dimensions structure of media markets, political parallelism, professionalization of journalism, and the role of the state with regards to media systems; and of the five dimensions the role of the state, type of democracy (consensus vs. majoritarian), type of pluralism (individual vs. organized), degree of rational-legal authority, and degree of pluralism (moderate vs. polarized) with reference to the political contexts of media systems. According to specific constellations of the variables within these dimensions, Hallin and Mancini conceptualized the three models of media and politics.

=== Dimensions: media systems ===
==== Structure of media markets ====
The structure of media markets is concerned with the development of a mass press. The authors highlight several variables which can be used to describe the characteristics of press systems:

- newspaper circulation rates
- newspaper-readership relationship (elite- vs. mass-orientation)
- gender differences in newspaper reach
- relative importance of newspapers and television as sources of news
- ratio of local, regional, and national newspapers
- degree of a clear separation between sensationalist mass press and quality press
- regional or linguistic segmentation of media markets
- influence of bordering countries on the national media system

==== Political parallelism ====
Political parallelism refers to the “fact that media in some countries have distinct political orientations, while media in other countries do not.” The authors established 5 factors or indicators to assess the extent of political parallelism:

- the extent of political orientation within media content
- organizational connections between the media and political organizations
- the tendency of media personnel to take part in political life
- partisanship of media audiences
- journalists’ role orientation and practices (e.g. journalists as advocates vs. neutral arbiters, opinion-oriented vs. information-oriented reporting style, separating vs. blending commentary and information)
- internal pluralism (i.e. covering different opinions and perspectives within one medium) or external pluralism (i.e. covering different opinions and perspectives within one media branch (e.g. the press system))
- the regulation of public service broadcasting (e.g. controlled by the government, insulated from direct political control, proportional representation of political parties or socially relevant groups)

==== Professionalization of journalism ====
The professionalization refers to the continuum of independent to instrumentalized journalism:

- degree of autonomy
- development of distinct professional norms and rules (e.g. practical routines or ethical principles)
- public service orientation of the journalists (i.e. orientation towards an ethic of public service rather than towards interests of individual persons)

==== Role of the state ====
This dimension stresses the power the political system has in shaping the structure and functioning of a media system. “But there are considerable differences in the extent of state intervention as well as in the forms it takes.” Hallin and Mancini use the following variables to cover this fourth dimension:

- censorship or other types of political pressure
- endowment of the media with economic subsidies
- ownership of media- or telecommunication-organizations
- provision of regulations for the media (laws, licensing, etc.)
- the state as an information source and “primary definer” of news

Ultimately, the interrelations of these four dimensions are complex. They have to be assessed empirically for every new case under study. Consequently, they may “influence one another in important ways, but also vary independently.”

=== Dimensions: political context ===
In a next step, Hallin and Mancini identified five core dimensions to assess the political contexts of media systems. They took relevant concepts from the literatures on comparative politics and political sociology to gain a better understanding of the political influences on the development of media systems. The resulting dimensions are presented as dichotomies, but they are just poles on a continuum.

The first dimension is the role of the state. It is conceptualized by the distinction between liberal democracies and welfare state democracies. The main difference between these two categories is the interventional activity of the state (e.g. funding vs. free market). This difference takes shape in the relative importance of private business or social institutions within the political system in question.

A further important dichotomic dimension is labeled consensus vs. majoritarian democracy. Majoritarian democratic systems contain two dominating parties and, due to the plurality voting system, the winning party actually concentrates the political power so that there is a clear distinction between the government and the opposition. Furthermore, the Cabinet predominantly influences political decision processes. By contrast, the consensus politics model encompasses a multi-party system which is based on the power sharing principle according to the proportional representation so that compromise and cooperation between the opposing forces are central. Additionally, there is a separation of power between legislative and executive.

The third dimension is the distinction between individual and organized pluralism resp. liberalism and corporatism. Individual pluralism is defined as the organization of the political representation “in terms of the relation between governing institutions and individual citizens, along with a multiplicity of competing ‘special interests’”. On the other hand, the focus on organized social groups is more important within organized pluralism systems. Thus, corporatism includes the “formal integration of social groups into the political process”.

Hallin and Mancini identify the distinction between rational-legal authority and clientelism as another crucial dimension. Following Max Weber, Hallin and Mancini use the term rational-legal authority in its meaning as a form of governance whose main influence is maintained through formal and universalistic rules of procedure, i.e. an independent and autonomous administrative apparatus not affected by political and economic interests or lobbyism. This apparatus is the main institution of an efficient rational-legal system. In contrast, the orientation on common interests is much weaker within clientelism systems because individual interests and private relationships are the main forces maintaining the social organization. Consequently, “access to social resources is controlled by patrons and delivered to clients in exchange for deference and various forms of support”.

The final dimension is conceptualized by the distinction between moderate and polarized pluralism. Low consensus, challenged legitimacy of the political organizations or system, and deep cleavages within the political landscape are the main characteristics of polarized pluralism. An important indicator is the existence of anti-system parties and factions. Compared to this, moderate pluralism is mainly characterized by stronger tendencies toward the center, lower ideological differences between the political parties, greater acceptance of the political system, and better chances to gain consensus during political controversies.

=== The three models of media and politics ===
By using the aforementioned dimensions, Hallin and Mancini deduced and conceptualized three ideal models of media-politics relations (‘ideal’ according to Max Weber). Hallin and Mancini could identify specific patterns by geographical regions which were crucial for labeling the individual models:

==== The Three Models: Media System Characteristics ====
Dimensions	Mediterranean or Polarized Pluralist Model France, Greece, Italy, Portugal, Spain	North/Central Europe or Democratic Corporatist Model Austria, Belgium, Denmark, Finland, Germany, Netherlands, Norway, Sweden, Switzerland	North Atlantic or Liberal Model Britain, United States, Canada, Ireland
Newspaper Industry	low newspaper circulation; elite politically oriented press	high newspaper circulation; early development of mass-circulation press	medium newspaper circulation; early development of mass-circulation commercial press
Political Parallelism	high political parallelism; external pluralism, commentary-oriented journalism; parliamentary or government model of broadcast governance; politics-over-broadcasting systems	external pluralism especially in national press; historically strong party press; shift toward neutral commercial press; politics-in-broadcasting system with substantial autonomy	neutral commercial press; information-oriented journalism; internal pluralism (but external pluralism in Britain); professional model of broadcast governance; formally autonomous system
Professionalization	weaker professionalization; instrumentalization	strong professionalization; institutionalized self-regulation	strong professionalization; non-institutionalized self-regulation
Role of the State in Media System	strong state intervention; press subsidies in France and Italy; periods of censorship; “savage deregulation” (except France)	strong state intervention but with protection for press freedom; press subsidies, particularly strong in Scandinavia; strong public-service broadcasting	market dominated (except strong public broadcasting in Britain and Ireland)

==== The Three Models: Political System Characteristics ====
Dimensions	Mediterranean or Polarized Pluralist Model France, Greece, Italy, Portugal, Spain	North/Central Europe or Democratic Corporatist Model Austria, Belgium, Denmark, Finland, Germany, Netherlands, Norway, Sweden, Switzerland	North Atlantic or Liberal Model Britain, United States, Canada, Ireland
Political History; Patterns of Conflict and Consensus	late democratization; polarized pluralism	early democratization; moderate pluralism (except Germany, Austria pre-1945)	early democratization; moderate pluralism
Consensus or Majoritarian Government	both	predominantly consensus	predominantly majoritarian
Individual vs. Organized Pluralism	organized pluralism; strong role of political parties	organized pluralism; history of segmented pluralism; democratic corporatism	individualized representation rather than organized pluralism (especially United States)
Role of the State	dirigisme, strong involvement of state and parties in economy; periods of authoritarianism, strong welfare state in France and Italy	strong welfare state; significant involvement of state in economy	liberalism; weaker welfare state particularly in United States
Rational-Legal Authority	weaker development of rational-legal authority (except France); clientelism	strong development of rational-legal authority	strong development of rational-legal authority

=== Restrictions ===
Hallin and Mancini point to restrictions of their three models which have to be considered in order not to overvalue the validity and significance of them. First of all, they focus on nation states and this level of analysis allows a specific perspective on media-politics relations but misses other phenomena of importance (e.g. transnational developments of media markets in Europe). Another concern is that the cases summarized within the single models vary enormously (especially within the Liberal model). Consequently, the models show a wide range of cases which might blur their distinction. Furthermore, the media systems within the analyzed countries might not be homogeneous (e.g. the structural differences between the print system and the broadcasting system in Germany). Because of the differences within the countries and the interferences between them, it is difficult to treat the 18 countries analyzed, as single cases because they depend on each other and influence each other. A final point is the dynamic of media systems because they cannot be assumed as static entities. Hence, media systems will always progress and there will always be changes resulting from those developing processes, so that reconsidering the characteristics of the mentioned models becomes necessary over time. Consequently, Hallin and Mancini point out in subsequent discussions that their models are not intended to be universal typologies which can be applied to other cases mechanically. Instead, they suggest rather focusing on the dimensions and their applicability and adaption to analyze other media systems adequately – e.g. regarding Eastern European media systems, they propose to attach more weight to the role of the state and especially to the role of civil society to understand these systems appropriately.

=== The convergence-thesis ===
At the end of their book, Hallin and Mancini discuss the convergence- or homogenization-thesis. The basis for their argument is their observation of several transformation processes that take place especially in Europe. The most important processes are the European integration, politically as well as with regards to the media (e.g. European media laws), the decline of traditional political mass parties, the American influence on the professionalization of journalism, and finally the commercialization of the media markets in Europe. These are the main reasons why Hallin and Mancini conclude, that the European countries might be pushed toward the Liberal model. They even go one step further and hypothesize that the core forces of that homogenization- or convergence-process might be valid for other parts of the world. However, they point out that there might be limitations to this process as well because the elements of the process are anchored in the structural differences between the political systems around the world.

== Reactions and discussion ==
Hallin and Mancini's approach has received general praise among scholars of the field, with some researchers calling it “the most well-developed analytical framework so far for understanding the relationship between media and political systems.” There has been much scholarly discussion about the applicability of Hallin and Mancini's framework to other, especially non-Western countries. Consequently:

- Some researchers reflect upon the nature of the Polarized Pluralist model and its alleged applicability for many media systems beyond the Western world, for it seems to be a catch-all residual model.
- A related issue is the question whether the Polarized Pluralist model involves negative normative implications (compared to the other two models) what would turn it into an inferior or less-well developed model.
- Many researchers challenge the convergence-thesis because they identify serious differences between the cases they study and those Hallin and Mancini focused on, so that they conclude that globalization will rather result in hybridization- than in convergence-processes. Concerning Western media systems, Hardy for example notes to include matters of ownership concentration and cultural processes to clarify and meet the complexity of convergence-processes.
- A related point is the total exclusion of influential new online technologies and media which are of central importance for understanding transformations of media systems as well as the communication patterns within, between and beyond them. Additionally, Hardy criticizes the neglect of all forms of entertainment media.
- One of the main debates is about the extent to which the variables Hallin and Mancini use to measure the dimensions must be adapted to non-Western cases to meet their particular conditions. Others criticize Hallin and Mancini's concentration on media-politics relations because this perspective neglects interrelated variables, e.g. economic or cultural contexts.
- Concerning transnational and global developments, relations and influences around the world, some researches ask the question whether the nation state as a level of analysis is still appropriate. For example, Jakubowicz argues that this methodological nationalism (cf. Mihelj et al., 2008) is inappropriate, for “media systems are no longer exclusively related to single political systems”, whereas Hardy notes that “[t]he political, legislative, cultural and social dimensions of the state are not simply diminished by globalisation” and that “communication systems remain, to a significant degree, national in organization and orientation.”
- A related debate is about the adequacy of focusing on structures and systems, as Hallin and Mancini did it, rather than considering more dynamic agencies and processes which cannot be covered entirely by a system-approach.
- Hallin and Mancini decided to use a model- or ideal types-approach to explain certain patterns of their cases. Other researchers remark on the risk of generalizing and abstracting too early within the research process.

There are many studies that apply and adapt the framework for their cases under study. For example, Dobek-Ostrowska and colleagues published the edited volume Comparative Media Systems. European and Global Perspective (2010) which contains comparative studies referring to or applying Hallin and Mancini's framework for Central and Eastern Europe media systems. Hallin and Mancini published the edited volume Comparing Media Systems Beyond the Western World (2012) which gives a comprehensive overview with a more global perspective. Case studies from the media systems of Israel, Poland, Baltic states, Brazil, South Africa, Russia, China, and the Arab world are discussed by the contributors and a methodological reflection of Hallin and Mancini's framework with regards to non-Western media systems is added.

Further research was conducted by Jonathan Hardy, who analyzed the implications of transformation processes shaping contemporary media systems. As Hallin and Mancini did, Hardy focuses on media systems within Western democracies (actually 18 countries) and he adjoins their convergence thesis while he concentrates on print and broadcasting (especially TV). He chooses four paradigms (namely the liberal democratic theory, neoliberalism, libertarianism, and the critical political economy) as an analytical framework to examine relationships between media and politics, media and policy, media ownership and transnationalisation processes.

Furthermore, Roger Blum's approach (2005) is an attempt to broaden and complete Hallin and Mancini's models by adding and modifying dimensions (he developed nine instead of four dimensions), classifying them as liberal, regulated, or as in between these two poles. Blum identifies six models of media systems, but he does “not explain how he created the models and why no other combination of specification is necessary”, so Blum's framework is still in need for empirical support.

Other studies focus on a single aspect of Hallin and Mancini's framework and analyze it in detail. For example, Curran and his colleagues (2009) study the implications of the movement towards rather market-driven media and compare news contents and public knowledge of public affairs within different media systems by testing the hypothesis, “that market-based systems (…) impede the exercise of informed citizenship.”

There were also several conferences “triggered” by Hallin and Mancini's framework; for example the International Media and Communication Conference “Comparing Media Systems: West Meets East” organized by the Department of Communication and Journalism at the University of Wroclaw (April 23–25, 2007), where more than 100 researchers attained or conferences initiated by Hallin and Mancini themselves in Perugia in 2007, and in San Diego in 2009.

In communication studies, Hallin and Mancini's framework have helped in elevating comparative media system research to an important subfield of mediated cross-border communication.

== See also ==
- Political parallelism
- Comparative politics
- Political sociology
- Transformation processes (media systems)
- Mediated cross-border communication
