= The Hybrid (film) =

- Film poster
- Directed by: Billy O'Brien
- Produced by: Lionel Hicks
- Starring: John Lynch; Craig Conway; Antonia Thomas; Jumayn Hunter; Morjana Alaoui; Beth Winslet; Ned Dennehy
- Cinematography: Magni Ágústsson
- Edited by: Steve Mercer
- Music by: Adrian Johnston
- Production company: Liquid Noise
- Distributed by: Metrodome
- Release date: 8 March 2014 (Fantasporto)
- Running time: 94 minutes
- Country: United Kingdom
- Language: English
- Budget: £1.3 million

The Hybrid (filmed as Scintilla) is a 2014 British science fiction horror film directed by Billy O'Brien. It stars John Lynch as a mercenary who must lead his team to an Eastern European bunker and infiltrate it. There, he finds a scientist has created a human-alien hybrid. It premiered at Fantasporto and had its UK premiere at the Edinburgh International Film Festival.

== Plot ==
Jim Powell, a mercenary, is released from prison when a corporation wants to hire him. He is to accompany a scientist, Dr. Lyla Healy, to a former Soviet lab now occupied by a militia and recover the remaining assets. Powell reforms his team, including soldiers Steinmann, Mason, and Corry, and engineers Harris and Williams. Powell is frustrated to learn corporate security man Spencer will be joining them, but Healy insists. As the mercenaries approach the bunker, they are nearly discovered by a scout on a motorcycle. After taking cover in what they suspect to be a minefield, they press on. The bunker itself is fortified by many militia members. Harris and Williams attempt to infiltrate the camp. When Williams' Russian accent does not seem to be convincing the camp's guards, Harris improvises a drunken, anti-Russian rant in Georgian. As the other mercenaries grow tense, the leader of the camp responds well and allows Williams and Harris to enter.

Williams and Harris take control of the base's security system and remotely guide the rest of the team to the underground bunker. Steinmann becomes spooked but does not find any enemies. Corry, leading the rear, is surprised by a silent attacker, who stabs him with a syringe before disappearing again. Alerted by his gunfire, Powell orders them to ignore the attacker, as they do not have enough time to search. Corry keeps quiet about the syringe, though he rapidly becomes ill. After developing boils and a fever, he falls behind, unnoticed by the others. After seeing more hostiles on the security system, Harris leaves Williams behind to warn the others. While joining them, he is shot in the stomach. Exiting a series of tunnels, they find the lab. Powell sets up Harris at a medical area, and they search the area, finding Dr. Irvine.

Irvine greets Healy, revealing Healy as her former assistant. Though ordered not to ask any questions, Powell becomes frustrated with the lack of information provided to him and demands Irvine explain the situation. Irvine says the Soviets, though cutting edge in other sciences, fell behind in genetic engineering. When they discovered what they believed to be extraterrestrial DNA in a meteorite, they lured her with promises of completely unfettered research. Free of any ethical or legal restraints, she created two hybrid alien-human creatures. The hybrids, though only several years old, have reached sexual maturity, and she has bred them. Reasoning that they are unintelligent, she plans to sacrifice the female's life to grow a purer specimen, as their physiology precludes the female from surviving a pregnancy. Enraged by Irvine's callousness to the female's suffering, Steinmann kills the female out of mercy.

Healy demands that Powell kill Irvine now that she and her work have become useless. When Powell refuses, Mason assaults him and reveals that he and Harris have already struck a bargain with Healy. Steinmann, who left the others to tell the male hybrid, Goethe, that his sister has died, realizes too late that he is intelligent and has hidden a weapon. After disabling her, Goethe kills Irvine. Powell and Mason reconcile now that they have no further conflict over whether to kill Irvine, and they leave the lab to stop Goethe, who has fled. Meanwhile, Healy murders Steinmann, and, when she reveals her intention to kill Harris, he uses a grenade to destroy the lab. Mason returns to the lab and finds everyone dead. Spencer suggests that since the mission has been a complete failure, they simply leave together without worrying about any other objectives.

A mutated Corry attacks and kills Spencer, only to be killed by Powell. Mason and Powell exit the tunnels and reunite with Williams; the group find the militia camp in disarray, fighting a losing battle against Goethe. Mason offers to sacrifice himself to give Powell a chance to kill Goethe. Healy, revealed to have survived, shoots Powell, wounding him; Williams kills her with a shotgun shot in response. The hybrid splits Mason in two with a machete. As Powell approaches the alien, it addresses him, telling him to kill it. Powell hesitates, and Goethe escapes, later being revealed to have entered the United Kingdom.

== Cast ==
- John Lynch as Jim Powell
- Craig Conway as Mason
- Antonia Thomas as Steinmann
- Jumayn Hunter as Spencer
- Morjana Alaoui as Dr. Lyla Healy
- Beth Winslet as Dr. Irvine
- Ned Dennehy as Harris
- Perri Hanson as Goethe
- Edward Dogliani as Corry
- Chris Ellis-Stanton as Williams

== Production ==
Shooting lasted 24 days and took place in Huddersfield, West Yorkshire, England. Huddersfield native Biff Byford performed on the film's soundtrack. Byford later released an album with songs inspired by the film.

== Release ==
The Hybrid premiered at Fantasporto on 8 March 2014 and had its UK premiere at the Edinburgh International Film Festival. It was released on DVD in the US in December 2016.

== Reception ==
Andrew Marshall of Starburst rated it 5/10 stars and wrote, "Scintilla is a mix of parts that don't slot together well enough to form a coherent whole." Beth Webb of HeyUGuys.com called it "a dull, rehearsed story that takes itself too seriously", saying that it should have played up its more exploitative elements.
