= Colin Seymour-Ure =

British Academic

Colin Knowlton Seymour-Ure (11 November 1938 – 18 November 2017) was professor of government at the University of Kent at Canterbury. He was a specialist in the history of political cartoons and caricature and was one of the founders of the British Cartoon Archive.

== Selected publications ==
- David Low
- The Political Impact Of Mass Media
- Prime Ministers and the Media: Issues of Power and Control
- The British Press and Broadcasting Since 1945
- The American President: Power and Communication
