= Denis McQuail =

British scholar (1935-2017)

- Born: 12 April 1935; Wallington, London, England
- Died: 25 June 2017 (aged 82); London, England
- Education: University of Oxford (BA, MA); University of Leeds (PhD)
- Employer: University of Amsterdam
- Known for: Media Performance: Mass Communication and the Public Interest (1992)
- Writing career
- Subjects: Communication studies
- Spouse: Rosemary Beveridge (m. 1966; died 2014)
- Children: 4

Denis McQuail (12 April 1935, London – 25 June 2017) was a British communication theorist, Emeritus Professor at the University of Amsterdam, considered one of the most influential scholars in the field of mass communication studies.

== Biography ==
Denis McQuail was born in Wallington, London on 12 April 1935 to Irish immigrant parents Annie (née Mullan) and Christopher McQuail. After schooling at St Anselm's college in Birkenhead, he spent his national service in the Intelligence Corps learning Russian and studied history at Corpus Christi College, Oxford. McQuail obtained his BA in Modern History from the University of Oxford in 1958, and the next year his MA in Public and Social Administration. He obtained his PhD in social studies from the University of Leeds in 1967 with the thesis, entitled Factors affecting public interest in television plays.

McQuail started his academic career in the UK. On 1 August 1977, he was appointed Professor at the University of Amsterdam, where on 6 November 1978 he spoke the inaugural lecture, entitled "The historicity of a science of mass media: time, place, circumstances and the effects of mass communication." After his early retirement on 1 January 1997, he was appointed Emeritus Professor. He was also visiting professor in the Department of Politics at the University of Southampton.

The Amsterdam School of Communication Research (ASCoR) established the Denis McQuail Award in his honour which is awarded each year to the best article advancing communication theory since 2006.

== Selected publications ==
- McQuail, Denis: Sociology of Mass Communications. Selected Readings, 1972
- McQuail, Denis: Media Performance: Mass Communication and the Public Interest, Sage: London, 1992
- McQuail, Denis and Windahl, Sven: Communication Models for the Study of Mass Communications 1994 (2nd Edition)
- McQuail, Denis and Karen Siune for the Euromedia Research Group (eds.): Media Policy: Convergence, Concentration and Commerce, Sage: London, 1998
- McQuail, Denis (ed.): McQuail's Reader in Mass Communication Theory, Sage: London, 2002
- McQuail, Denis: McQuail's Mass Communication Theory, 2010 (sixth edition)
