= Women in media =

Women in media are individuals who participate in media. Media are the collective communication outlets or tools used to store and deliver information or data. The role of women in media revolves around the four axes of media: media freedom, media pluralism, media independence, and media safety.

Women in media face the same difficulties and threats as men, and additionally experience gender inequalities, safety issues, or under-representation. Compared to men, women are much less likely to be included in the media globally. According to research, a minimum of twenty-five percent of news on television, radio and in the press mention women as a topic. According to a 2015 survey, only 19% of news experts and 37% of reporters worldwide were women. The gender-imbalanced perspective of society has the potential to promote and perpetuate harmful gender stereotypes, as behavioral scientists study the underrepresentation of women in the workforce.

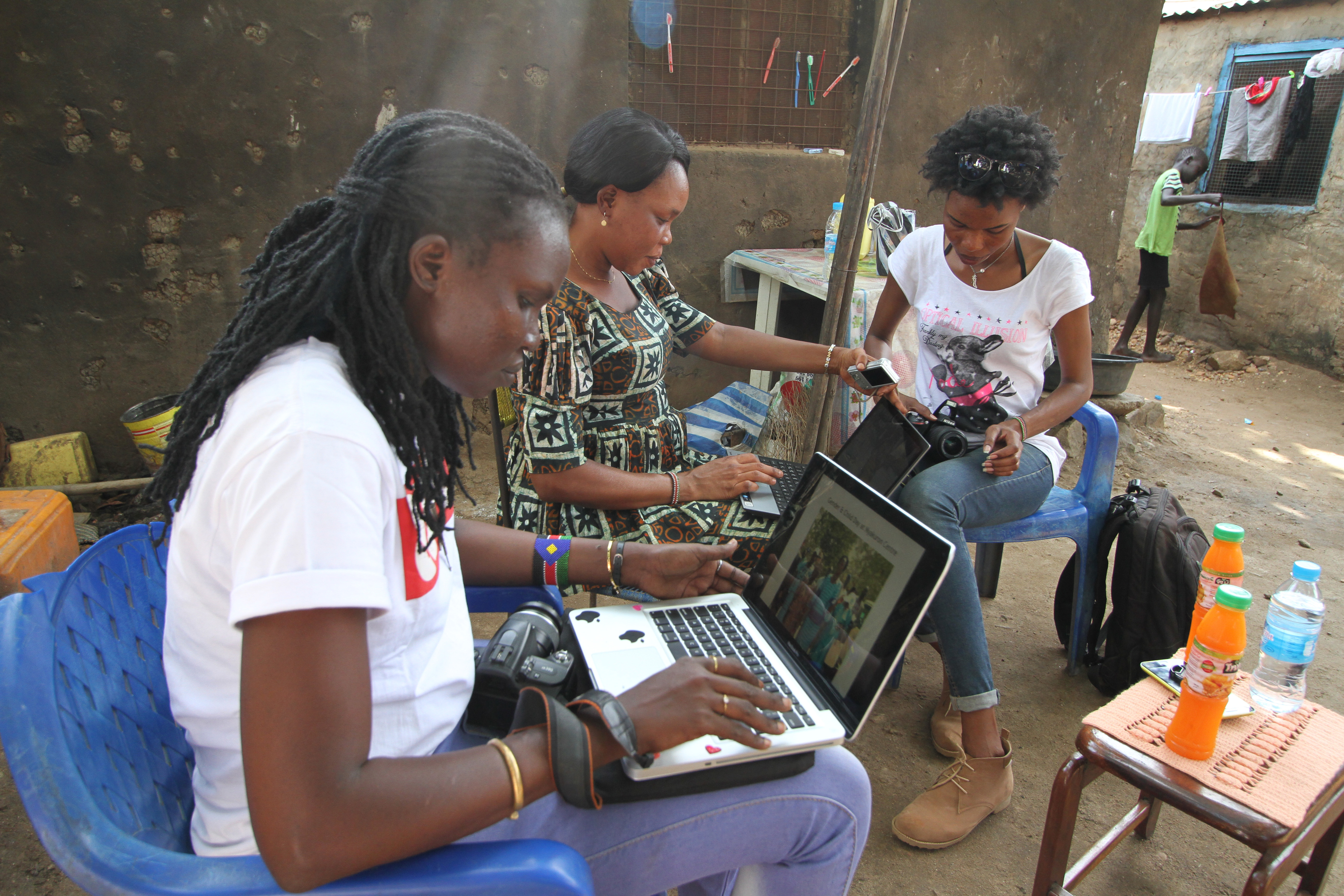
Fred Cifuentes, journalists undergoing training in South Sudan

== Safety of women journalists ==
Safety of journalists is the ability for journalists and media professionals to receive, produce and share information without facing physical or moral threats. Women journalists also face increasing dangers such as sexual assault, "whether in the form of a targeted sexual violation, often in reprisal for their work; mob-related sexual violence aimed against journalists covering public events; or the sexual abuse of journalists in detention or captivity. Many of these crimes are not reported as a result of powerful cultural and professional stigmas." Women working in the media face disproportionate and specialized dangers, as well as increasing offline and online attacks. The gender-based violence they face includes online harassment, sexist bullying, physical harm, rape and even murder.

=== Threats on women journalists ===
Women journalists, whether they are working in an insecure context, or in a newsroom, face risks of physical assault, sexual harassment, sexual assault, rape, and even murder. Women journalists are vulnerable to attacks not only from those attempting to silence their coverage but also from sources, colleagues, and others. A 2014 global survey of nearly 1,000 journalists, initiated by the International News Safety Institute (INSI) in partnership with the International Women's Media Foundation (IWMF) and with the support of UNESCO, found that nearly two-thirds of women who took part in the survey had experienced intimidation, threats or abuse in the workplace.

In the period from 2012 through 2016, UNESCO's Director-General denounced the killing of 38 women journalists, representing 7 per cent of all journalists killed. The percentage of journalists killed who are women is significantly lower than their overall representation in the media workforce. This large gender gap is likely partly the result of the persistent under-representation of women reporting from war zones or insurgencies or on topics such as politics and crime.

The September 2017 report of the United Nations Secretary-General outlines a way forward for a gender-sensitive approach to strengthening the safety of women journalists. In 2016, the Council of Europe’s Committee of Ministers adopted recommendation CM/Rec(2016)4 on the protection of journalism and the safety of journalists and other media actors, in particular noting the gender-specific threats that many journalists face and calling for urgent, resolute and systematic responses. The same year, the IPDC council requests the UNESCO Director-General's report to include gender information.

Legal harassment is the biggest threat to female journalists, according to a report by the Coalition for Women in Journalism. So far this year, at least 72 cases of legal harassment have been reported to the CFWIJ. When the number of detentions is added, it becomes clear how the legal system can be misused to target and silence journalists, posing a serious threat to female journalists.

Another big issue is harassment, which can happen online and at work. The sexual nature of the harassment women experience is often rooted in misogyny, as evidenced by the numerous cases of rape threats and sexually explicit manipulated photos and videos that have been used to defame and disparage female journalists. The so-called "double onslaught" on female journalists is visible again: they are targeted both for their gender and their profession. For this reason, it is crucial to focus on the gendered components of the dangers to which female journalists are exposed. The harassment women journalists face, whether online or offline, threatens their right to freedom of expression and limits the diversity of opinion in the media.

=== Online harassment of women journalists ===
Research by Pew Research Center indicated that 73 per cent of adult internet users in the United States had seen someone be harassed in some way online and 40 per cent had personally experienced harassment, with young women being particularly vulnerable to sexual harassment and stalking.

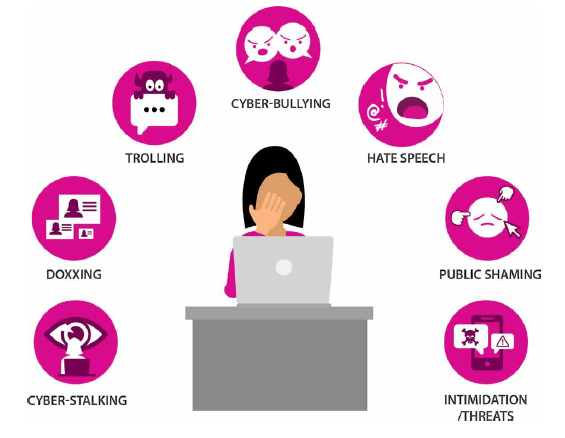
Online harassment of women journalists, World Trends Report 2018

An analysis of more than two million Tweets performed by the think tank Demos found that women journalists experienced approximately three times as many abusive comments as their male counterparts on Twitter.

The Guardian surveyed the 70 million comments recorded on its website between 1999 and 2016 (only 22,000 of which were recorded before 2006). Of these comments, approximately 1.4 million (approximately two per cent) were blocked for abusive or disruptive behavior. Of the 10 staff journalists who received the highest levels of abuse and ‘dismissive trolling’, eight were women.

The INSI and IWMF survey found that more than 25 per cent of ‘verbal, written and/or physical intimidation including threats to family and friends’ took place online.

Countering online abuse is a significant challenge, and few legislative and policy frameworks exist on the international or national level to protect journalists from digital harassment.

The International Federation of Journalists and the South Asia Media Solidarity Network launched the Byte Back campaign to raise awareness and combat online harassment of women journalists in the Asia-Pacific region.

The Organization for Security and Cooperation in Europe (OSCE) organized an expert meeting titled ‘New Challenges to Freedom of Expression: Countering Online Abuse of Female Journalists’ which produced a publication of the same title that includes the voices of journalists and academics on the realities of online abuse of women journalists and how it can be combated.

== Media freedom for feminism ==
Media freedom is the freedom to participate in media, the rights of expression, and access to and production of media content. These are all issues that can be fully understood only by considering their gender equality dimensions as they often overlap, and they have been compounded by the growing complexity of the digital sphere. Across all these issues, women do not enjoy full equality with men, nor do they have their work valued to the same extent as men. In many newsrooms around the world, there continues to be a culture that makes it difficult for women to progress. In such workplaces, harassment is common, and a lack of monitoring means that even with gender equality policies in place, they are often ineffective in challenging gender discrimination. In addition to documenting violence against women, providing forums for women's views, raising awareness of women's experiences, and ensuring that biases against women journalists are addressed, the media is key to promoting gender equality and eradicating discrimination.

=== Under-representation of women ===
A related challenge has been the absence of women's voices as an issue in media freedom, including in internet governance policy-making more generally. This ongoing issue appears to have stagnated in recent years. The Internet Governance Forum (IGF) Dynamic Coalition on Gender and Internet Governance, which pushes for recognition of the gendered issues relating to Internet governance, reports that although women's participation at the 2015 IGF reached close to parity, women were still underrepresented in discussion and debates: only 37 per cent of panelists were women, a decline from 40 per cent the previous year.

In organizations, such as the Internet Association for Assigned Names and Numbers (ICANN), senior leadership positions remain largely dominated by men. In 2017, ICANN's board of directors consisted of four women and 16 men. Minimizing the divide between the number of women and men in senior decision-making roles in relation to internet governance is an important step to ensuring that gender-based issues relating to access, privacy and security are prioritized.

In the face of prevailing inequality, civil society continues to be a force for progress. Other organizations are working to push for greater representation and key standard-setting bodies, such as the Gender and Internet Governance Exchange, initiated by the Association for Progressive Communications, which aims to redress the gap in participation by women's and Sexual rights’ activists in Internet governance policy processes. In 2017, The Coalition For Women in Journalism developed a mentorship program for mid-career journalists to ensure that women journalists do not opt out of their profession because of stress, sexism in the newsroom, the pay gap, and other such problems.

=== Freedom of information ===
Women's freedom of information and access to information is far from being equal to men's. It's the access to information gender divide. Social barriers such as illiteracy and lack of digital empowerment have created stark inequalities in navigating the tools used for access to information, often exacerbating a lack of awareness of issues that directly relate to women and gender, such as sexual health. There have also been examples of more extreme measures, such as local community authorities banning or restricting mobile phone use for girls and unmarried women in their communities. A number of States, including some that have introduced new laws since 2010, notably censor voices from and content related to the LGBTQI community, posing serious consequences to access to information about sexual orientation and gender identity. Digital platforms play a powerful role in limiting access to certain content, such as YouTube's 2017 decision to classify non-explicit videos with LGBTQ themes as ‘restricted’, a classification designed to filter out ‘potentially inappropriate content’.

=== Online activity ===
Gendered aspects of media freedom intersect heavily with journalists’ safety. Women journalists face unique concerns, such as personal safety when dealing with confidential sources, which can restrict their freedom of expression and add challenges that can hamper their ability to carry. Another dimension is the manifestation of physical violence as virtual violence through the increased incidence of hate speech and abuse directed towards women and the LGBTQI community. Such abuse has had a chilling effect and disrupted the online participation of these communities. Countering the proliferation of such abuse has proved a serious challenge for policy-makers wanting to minimize the harm directed towards vulnerable groups. To mark International Women's Day in 2017, the United Nations Special Rapporteur on the promotion and protection of the right to freedom of opinion and expression noted the challenges for governments, corporate bodies and civil society organizations to address such abuses while remaining attentive to international human rights law. He counseled against censorship and undue restrictions on freedom of expression as a means of curbing online abuse, warning that such restrictions could ‘end up undermining the rights of the very women for whom governments and corporate actors may seek to provide redress’.

== Media pluralism ==
Media diversity concerning media functions such as information, education, and entertainment is called media pluralism. Media pluralism is evaluated in terms of access, plurality of economic models and diversity of content. Gender equality in decision-making roles, the media workforce and representation in the media has not yet been reached in any of these areas according to UNESCO's World Trends Report. Media pluralism and diversity of opinion are essential elements of press freedom. A media-free free society can only be in existence in a market that is not monopolized. Without media freedom and pluralism, citizens cannot control their governments or have the knowledge they need to make well-informed decisions. The entitlement to freedom of expression and free flow of information is possible only if societies have unrestricted access to various media and freedom of choice, in accordance with Article 19 of the Universal Declaration of Human Rights and the International Covenant on Civil Rights. is and political rights. As a whole, we can take a deep dive at external media pluralism, which refers to the existence of numerous and different media content providers in a particular media market, and internal media pluralism, which refers to the existence of different content, the availability of different perspective

=== Background ===
In the mid-1970s, pioneering academics made the first systematic analysis of women's relationship to and visibility in the mass media. They used the term ‘symbolic annihilation’ (originally credited to George Gerbner) to describe what they found. Almost 40 years later, many gender and media scholars suggest that progress has stalled, and there is significant work left to be done, including in relation to mainstream media. Women still feature less frequently than men in news discourse; women journalists and media professionals are often locked out of the more prestigious beats, and their occupation of senior positions within media organizations is still minimal. According to the Global Media Monitoring Report in 2015, women made up only one in four media decision-makers, one in three reporters, and one in five experts interviewed.

Women's visibility in newspapers, television, and radio increased by only seven percentage points between 1995 (17 per cent) and 2015 (24 per cent). The opportunities afforded to ‘ordinary’ citizens by the creation of alternative online news platforms has meant, however, that women's voices and perspectives are finding expression via these informal media channels.

=== International recognition ===
The existence of problems regarding gender and media pluralism has also been recognized by regional and international organizations and agencies over several decades. In 2010, UNESCO developed a comprehensive set of Gender-Sensitive Indicators for Media, aimed at encouraging media organizations to benchmark themselves against equality criteria. In 2013, the Council of the European Parliament adopted the recommendation made by the European Institute for Gender Equality, that the media industry should adopt and implement gender equality indicators relating to women in decision-making, gender equality policies and women on boards.

During the 60th session of the Commission on the Status of Women in 2016, United Nations (UN) Women launched a new partnership with major media organizations to draw attention to and act on the 2030 agenda for sustainable development, which aims to eradicate all forms of inequality.

In 2015, UN Women launched ‘Step it Up for Gender Equality’, which had the tagline of ‘Planet 50:50 by 2030’. At the launch of that initiative, 70 nations committed to the gender equality agenda, and two years later, that number had increased to 93. In 2016, a review by UN Women of actions taken by these pledging nations reported a large number of initiatives, although none of them explicitly mentioned the media. Yet despite these initiatives, women remain excluded or marginalized in the media on the one hand, or else stereotyped and trivialized on the other. Longitudinal studies of women and news predict that this is unlikely to change soon. At the current pace of change, parity of visibility between women and men is unlikely to occur for another 40 years.

The Step it Up for Gender Equality Media Compact comprises a coalition of media outlets from around the globe and from diverse sectors who have committed themselves to focusing on gender equality in three main ways: in their reporting routines, by disrupting stereotypes and biases; by increasing the number of women in their organizations, including in leadership and decision-making roles; and in developing gender-sensitive corporate practices. At its launch, 39 media houses had already signed up as founding members of the Compact and although each will devise their own internal agenda, being a member of the Compact requires a minimum set of actions to be carried out.

=== Gender equality in the media workforce ===
In many countries, as many women as men are graduating from media, journalism and communication degree programs and entering the industry. In 1995, when the first substantial analysis of women media professionals across 43 nations was produced, women constituted around 40 per cent of the media workforce. Women are encouraged not to go into ‘hard’ news beats and instead are channeled into areas of news that are allegedly of more ‘interest’ to women and are also commonly held as being less prestigious. A Monitoring Project (Global Media Monitoring Project (GMMP)) 2015 report found that 31 per cent of stories on politics and 39 per cent of stories about the economy have female by-lines.

Stories about politics and crime see the fewest women reporters across all regions with the exception of Asia and Latin America. Even when women do report on ‘hard’ news stories, they often struggle to achieve visibility for their copy: just over a third (37 per cent) of stories in newspapers, television and radio newscasts had a female by-line or were visibly or audibly reported by women, the same as in GMMP's 2005 study. More focused individual country analyses show exactly the same trends; for example, research from the United States shows that while women journalists are writing on a wider range of topics, they are still a minority of columnists at the major dailies. In terms of presenting on broadcast news, the 2015 Global Media Monitoring Project found that the global proportion of women was 49 per cent, the same as in 2000 and two percentage points below the 1995 finding. Since 2005, the number of women working as reporters in broadcast news has dropped by four percentage points in television and radio.

Closer analysis from the World Trends report shows that women were more numerous on television (57 per cent) and less numerous on radio (41 per cent), where ‘looks’ are obviously far less important. The majority of younger presenters were women, but that trend reversed for older presenters, nearly all of whom were men. There were almost no women reporters recorded as older than 65.

The Women's Media Center (WMC) 2017 report on women and the media in the United States shows a picture that has little changed from the GMMP's latest findings or indeed, from findings of its own previous studies. At 20 of the nation's top news outlets, women produced 37.7 per cent of news reports, an increase of 0.4 percentage points compared to 2016. In broadcast news, women's presence as anchors, reporters and field journalists actually declined by nearly seven percentage points between 2015 and 2016. The WMC study found that these gender-based disparities existed across all news media as much in newspapers, online news, wire services as broadcast, but were especially stark in television news.

The digital world is as likely to perpetuate the same gender divisions that exist in the off-line world as the opposite. There is little evidence to suggest that digital media are employing or promoting more women than other parts of the media ecology. The GMMP’s latest findings suggest that women's visibility as both citizens and media professionals in online news sites and Twitter feeds was 26 per cent, only two percentage points higher than for television, radio and print. The situation behind the scenes at large internet companies, which hold influence over which news content is presented most visibly and are responsible for moderation of discussion and comments, has been equally dire.

=== Women and decision-making ===
The challenge for many women is much more than just breaking into the industry, but also being able to advance to the highest levels in their careers. The Global Report on the Status of Women in the News Media found that women in media occupied just over a quarter of the jobs in top management (27 per cent) and governance (26 per cent) positions. The regions that fared best for women representation were Central (33 per cent) and Eastern Europe (43 per cent) and the Nordic countries (36 per cent). Elsewhere, women comprised only about a fifth of governance positions and held less than 10 per cent of top management jobs in Asia and the Pacific region. A major European project funded by the European Institute for Gender Equality (EIGE) found very similar findings. Men held most of the senior management positions and board membership in 99 media houses across the European Union. Public sector organizations were more likely to recruit and promote women into senior positions than private sector media outlets.

In spite of the rapid increase in the number of women working in the media in the whole world today, studies show that the upper most jobs that include producers, executives, editors-in-chief, and publishers are still heavily dominated by men according to earlier research done. This case is rampant the African continent, where beliefs and stereotypes, still prevent women from pursuing the position of a journalist for instance traveling outside the home, working at night, and discussing topics such as politics and sports, which are considered part of the male sphere. According to the research done by Global Media Monitoring Project (GMMP), the feminine journalists have a higher chance of covering "easier" topics . Politics and economics are among the "hard" news topics that have a lower chance to be discussed or covered by feminine journalists.

Gender equality in decision-making positions and on boards in media organizations in Europe

In the Asia and Pacific region, a joint report by the UNESCO Office in Bangkok, UN Women and the International Federation of Journalists (IFJ) Asia Pacific found women were significantly under-represented in decision-making roles. In Southern Africa, a Gender Links study found that women constitute 40 per cent of media employees and 34 per cent of media managers. The study also revealed that sexual harassment remains a key issue for women: just under 20 per cent of women media professionals said that they had personal experience of sexual harassment and the majority of those women said that the perpetrator was a senior colleague.

For Mary Kosut, women remain vastly underrepresented as media owners, a trend that has continued unabated as media concentration has increased through media consolidation and convergence.

=== Gender and representation ===
Many feminist media scholars have argued that what we see in front of the camera is determined to some extent by who is behind the camera and there is some reason to believe that more women in the newsroom would produce news that is more diverse. Several studies, including the Global Media Monitoring Project (GMMP), show that women journalists are more likely to source women in their stories than men, leading to more balanced reporting which is better able to reflect the views of more and diverse communities. The size of the feminine involvement and effect in the media sector also has some impact on media content, as feminine media professionals have a higher chance of showcasing the necessities and outlook of other feminine compatriots than their male counterparts in the journalism and acting industry.

The 2015 GMMP was able to make comparisons across the 20 years in which it has been operating. Despite women's considerable advancement over the past two decades in the public and private sectors, female appearances in television, radio and print rose by only seven percentage points between 1995 (17 per cent) and 2015 (24 per cent). Where women most often appear in media, it is when they speak from personal experience (representing 38 per cent), while only 20 per cent of spokespersons and 19 per cent of experts featured in stories are women. The underrepresentation of women in media content extends across regions. Women featured in stories as 32 per cent of experts interviewed in North America, followed by the Caribbean (29 per cent) and Latin America (27 per cent). In the southern African region, Gender Links’ latest Gender and Media Progress Study covered 14 countries and found that women's views and voices accounted for a mere 20 per cent of news sources across Southern Africa media.

According to Sarah Macharia, even if more women appear in media, there may be limited impact on the entrenched biases and stereotypes present in media content. This can promote narrow gender roles that limit the choices and options available to everyone. This is why many actors continue to encourage all media workers to become more gender-sensitive through training and internal policies that monitor coverage and promote greater awareness of gender issues.

=== The picture for women in media ===
Women's accomplishments in the media sector have long remained under-recognized by traditional professional and news organizations, a trend that remains unchanged. Women have won only a quarter of Pulitzer Prizes for foreign reporting and only 17 per cent of awards of the Martha Gellhorn Prize for Journalism.

A number of organizations, mostly gender focused, have launched dedicated prizes to recognize achievements of women in media. The International Women's Media Foundation continues to recognize the courageous work of women journalists. In 2007, the Alliance of Women Film Journalists’ began giving out the EDA Awards annually to recognize women filmmakers and photojournalists. More recently, in 2015 the African Development Bank began sponsoring a category for Women's rights in Africa, designed to promote gender equality through the media, as one of the prizes awarded annually by One World Media.

In considering the way in which women’s contribution to the news environment is made visible, the UNESCO/Guillermo Cano World Press Freedom Prize is an annual award that honors a person, organization or institution that has made a notable contribution to the defense and/or promotion of press freedom anywhere in the world. Nine out of 20 winners have been women.

The Poynter Institute since 2014 has been running a Leadership Academy for Women in Digital Media, expressly focused on the skills and knowledge needed to achieve success in the digital media environment. Similar initiatives have begun to appear in other regions. UNESCO has also led workshops media professionals and community media in Gabon and Burundi, as part of its global efforts to enhance gender equality in the media.

== Media independence ==
Media independence is the capacity of a news outlet to provide accurate and unbiased information to the public. In a 2016 study of board members’ views in North America and Western Europe on the introduction of quotas, for example, individuals whose organizations (and countries) were committed to actions to increase women's representation were enthusiastic about the effects; but in contrast, individuals working in contexts without such commitments were rarely keen to embrace such strategies.

In addressing issues around gender and media independence, a number of advocacy and media monitoring initiatives have developed over the past few years that provide data on persistent gender inequalities. Media unions at local, national, regional and global levels have been prominent in working to protect the interests of women media workers, initiating women's caucuses, appointing women's officers, establishing women's conferences and developing handbooks of good practice. International Federation of Journalists (IFJ), for example, has a Gender Council (GC) which co-ordinates its gender-focused work. Since its inception, the GC has been IFJ's main vehicle to guide projects; formulate policy concerning gender and good practice; and advocate for and mainstream gender-based issues throughout IFJ, its projects and its member unions. During its 2016 Congress, the work of the GC was officially enshrined and protected through inclusion in the IFJ Constitution. Women media professionals themselves have also been active in forming their own networks to support and encourage each other, organizing events, developing mentoring schemes and initiating awards that recognize women's accomplishments.

=== Gender inequality in the media workplace ===
Research over the past two decades on the working conditions of women media professionals has mostly shown that women sometimes face hostility in the newsroom, which can be partly explained by the lack of organizational policies relating to gender equality and reporting mechanisms for harassment. The International Women's Media Foundation’s 2011 global study of women in the news media, cited in the previous chapter, found that more than half of the news media organizations surveyed had a company-wide policy on gender equality, but with significant variations between regions. More than two-thirds of organizations based in Western Europe and Africa had such policies, compared with a quarter in the Middle East and North Africa and less than 20 per cent in Central and Eastern European countries. The European Institute for Gender Equality’s 2013 report, which looked at 99 major media houses across Europe, found that a quarter of organizations had policies that included a provision for gender equality, often as part of broader equality directives in the society. It was notable that of the 99 organizations, public service bodies were much more likely than commercial ones to have equality policies in place. Media houses with such policies in place typically lacked mechanisms to monitor their effectiveness, thereby limiting their potential to effect change. The limitations of work practices to address gender inequalities do not reflect a lack of advocacy as there is evidence of a growing commitment towards gender equality on the part of media organizations. The Academy Awards are another organization that sees a low representation of women throughout several different categories of media. Although there was s small increase for women producers nominated for Best Picture in the 2022 Oscar's, only three out of the ten films that were nominated were written by women. In sprite of the fact that Best Picture saw improvement in 2022, Best Director however did not see the same results. Only 20% of the Academy Award nominations for Best Director were women. Out of the seven writers nominated for Original Screenplay, none of them were women.

=== Media monitoring and advocacy ===
In addition to the Global Media Monitoring Project, there are several regional initiatives which regularly monitor gendered aspects of the media, some of which also work with journalists to promote change within newsrooms.

The South Africa-based Gender Links, formed in 2001 to promote ‘gender equality in and through the media’ in Southern Africa, leads the media cluster of the Southern Africa Gender Protocol Alliance. Gender Links promotes media advocacy through global initiatives such as the Global Alliance on Media and Gender (GAMAG), hosting gender and media summits, developing policy in collaboration with regulators and working with media organizations through training and policy development. Gender Links is currently developing Centers of Excellence for Gender in the Media in 108 Newsroom across Southern Africa.

In 2016, the World Association for Christian Communication (WACC), the Global Media Monitoring Project (GMMP) Network and other partners launched a campaign to end news media sexism by 2020. The ‘End News Media Sexism’ campaign encourages and supports advocacy initiatives that promote changes in media policies and journalism practice. The campaign is taking a multi-disciplinary approach and uses a variety of different tools to promote awareness, including a gender scorecard against which media organizations are measured.

The African Women's Development and Communication Network (FEMNET), founded in 1988 as part of a broader project to promote women's empowerment in Africa, prioritizes women's development in the field of communication, where they have created and managed platforms to share information, ideas, strategies and experiences to foster cross-learning and more effective implementation of shared goals. FEMNET provides strategic policy recommendations through the production of reports and policy briefs. It has led extensive local capacity building initiatives, such as facilitating women's access to ICTs in Africa. In Asia, the South Asia Women's Network (SWAN) has rolled out a research project titled ‘Women for Change: Building a Gendered Media in South Asia’. Covering nine South Asian countries, it is partly supported by UNESCO's International Programme for the Development of Communication.

In addition, a number of national organizations work locally to redress the disparity in women's representation and participation in the media. Women, Media and Development (known by its Arabic acronym TAM) is a Palestine-based organization founded in 2004. TAM works with local women to promote their increased representation in the media and to foster an environment where they are able to effectively communicate and advocate for their rights. TAM provides training for women on how to access and use various media platforms, in addition to promoting community awareness and advocacy initiatives. TAM has facilitated capacity building and worked to counter stereotypes of women in the media by producing gender sensitive guides and training manuals, in addition to implementing projects that aim to increase women's access to decision-making positions and civic participation.

=== Formal and informal professional associations ===
A number of formal and informal networks of women media professionals also support women in the media. One of the oldest is the Alliance for Women in Media (AWM), originally established in 1951 as American Women in Radio and television, which supports women across all media to expand their networks, participate in training and professional development and celebrate their talents.

In 1975, it began its annual program of awards to recognize the work of program-makers and content-providers in promoting women and women's issues. A more regionally focused example is the Marie Colvin Journalists’ Network, a bilingual Arabic-English online community of women journalists working in the Arab world that aims to assist vulnerable local women journalists who lack support in relation to safety training, legal contracts, insurance or psychological care.

Media unions at local, regional and global levels have established caucuses for women and have campaigned to encourage more women to stand for elected office within formal union structures. In 2001, the International Federation of Journalists found that women represented 29 per cent of union membership in 38 countries but just 17 per cent of members on union governing bodies: in its 2010 report, it found that women's representation on boards had increased only slightly, to 15 per cent. In Europe, between 2006 and 2013, women's union membership went down from 45 per cent to 42 per cent and board membership also declined, from 39 per cent to 36 per cent.

== Sources ==
This article incorporates text from a free content work. Licensed under CC BY SA 3.0 IGO (license statement/permission). Text taken from World Trends in Freedom of Expression and Media Development Global Report, 202, UNESCO, UNESCO.
