= Media pluralism =

Plurality of voices, opinions, and analyses in media systems

Media pluralism defines the state of having a plurality of voices, opinions, and analyses in media systems (internal pluralism) or the coexistence of different and diverse types of medias and media support (external pluralism).

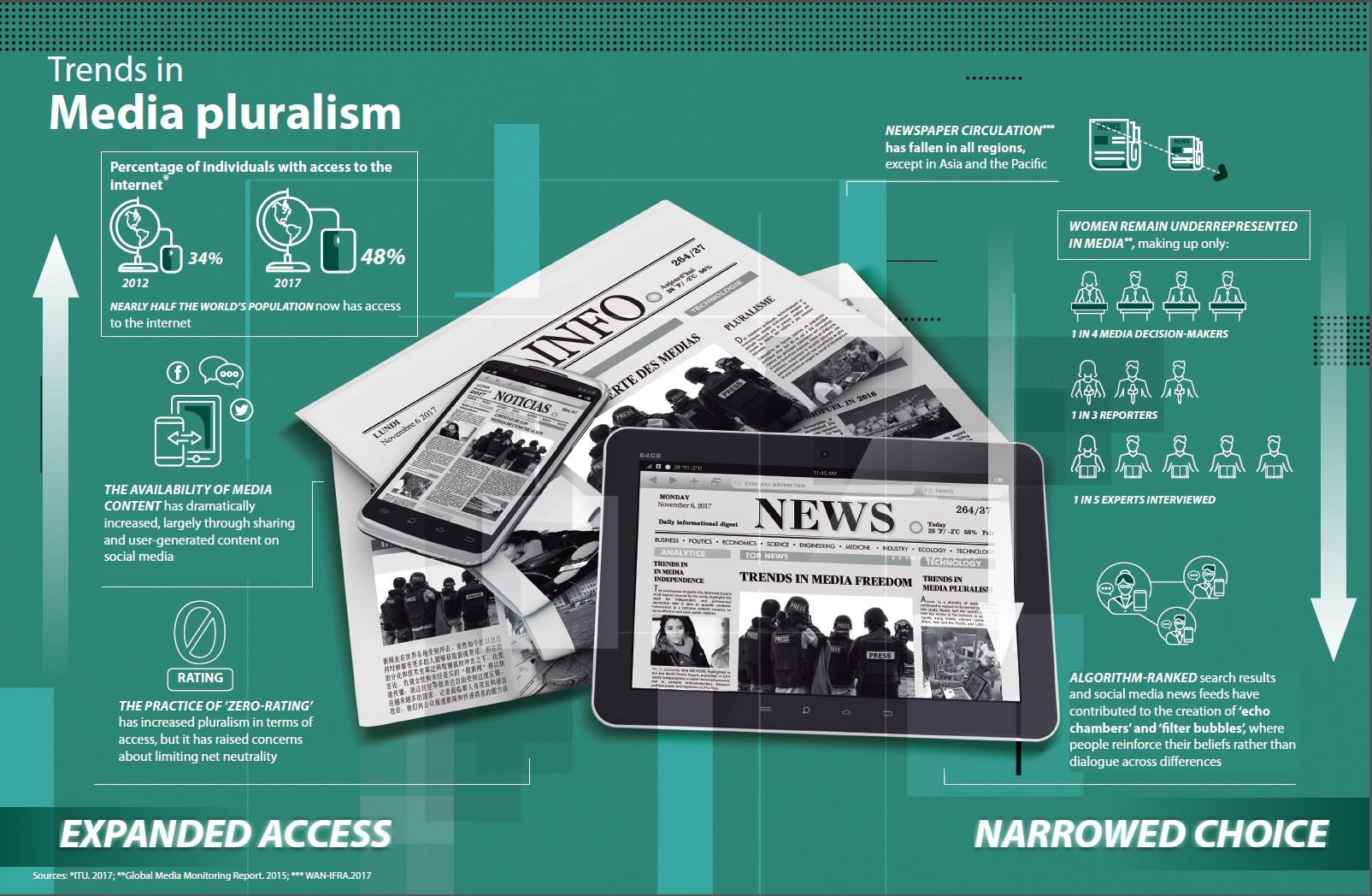
Media pluralism trends 2018, UNESCO's report on world trends in media

Media pluralism is often recognized by international organizations and non-governmental organizations as being an essential part of a democratic state, Reporters Without Borders considers "access to a plurality of editorial lines and analyses [as] essential for citizens to be able to confront ideas, to make their own informed choices and to conduct their life freely".

Expanded access to the Internet and the digital switch-over has enabled an increased availability of media content, largely through sharing and user-generated content on social media, in addition to the digital channels to which individuals have access across television and radio. The diversity of content is however accompanied by what Hallin and Mancini call "polarized pluralism" in a media system, in Comparing Media Systems.

According to the UNESCO report on world trends in freedom of expression and media development, a sharper division in the way we use news is coming up due to the interaction between consumption habits, changing economic models and technical systems. This signifies that even if multiple kinds of information and programming are available, each segmented group may only ingest one branch of the whole. The increase of Internet penetration and reliance on online sources for news is thought of to producing siloed debates.

At the infrastructural level, 'zero rating'— in which Internet or mobile service providers allow users to access specific content or applications without counting towards the user's data ‘cap’— expands in parallel to mobile uptakes, particularly in emerging countries. Traditional business models for the news media continue to be disrupted, leading to vertical and horizontal concentration and introduction of new types of ownership. Challenges to media funding introduce new types of economic models such as pay-walls and crowd-funding initiatives. Gender is a part of media pluralism and is characterized by the under-representation of women in the media workforce, in decision-making and in media content. People with disabilities are also under-represented in the media system.

Media capture is considered the primary threat to media pluralism.

Recent developments have highlighted the economic challenges facing media pluralism. UNSECO's 2025 World Trends Report notes that digital platforms receive a growing share of advertising revenue, putting financial pressure on traditional news organizations and potentially threatening their editorial independence. These challenges can affect the resources available for producing diverse and independent news coverage.

== Understanding media pluralism ==
- Pluralism involves sensitivity to a variety of economic ownership models and a technical architecture of delivery in which multichannel and multi-platform distribution is available.
- Pluralism often resonates with strong commitments on behalf of governments to public service and community media to provide for diversity.

Jakubowicz focuses on "provisions" or "supply" of media content and the impact of available information in a society. Evaluations of media pluralism have commonly explored the number of media outlets available; how comprehensively media outlets represent different groups and interests in society; and who owns or is able to influence the media. The explosion of access to media through the Internet, the increasingly common practice for users to consume information across a variety of platforms, and the rise of algorithmic profiling bring to the fore questions about users and how they access—or are shielded from accessing—a plurality of sources.

== Access ==
Access to information, as the ability for an individual to seek, receive and impart information effectively, is an aspect of media pluralism. It can include or allow "scientific, indigenous, and traditional knowledge; freedom of information, building of open knowledge resources, including open Internet and open standards, and open access and availability of data; preservation of digital heritage; respect for cultural and linguistic diversity, such as fostering access to local content in accessible languages; quality education for all, including lifelong and e-learning; diffusion of new media and information literacy and skills, and social inclusion online, including addressing inequalities based on skills, education, gender, age, race, ethnicity, and accessibility by those with disabilities; and the development of connectivity and affordable ICTs, including mobile, the Internet, and broadband infrastructures".

Michael Buckland defines six types of barriers that have to be overcome for access to information to be achieved: identification of the source, availability of the source, price of the user, cost to the provider, cognitive access, acceptability. While "access to information", "right to information", "right to know" and "freedom of information" are sometimes used as synonyms, the diverse terminology does highlight particular (albeit related) dimensions of the issue.

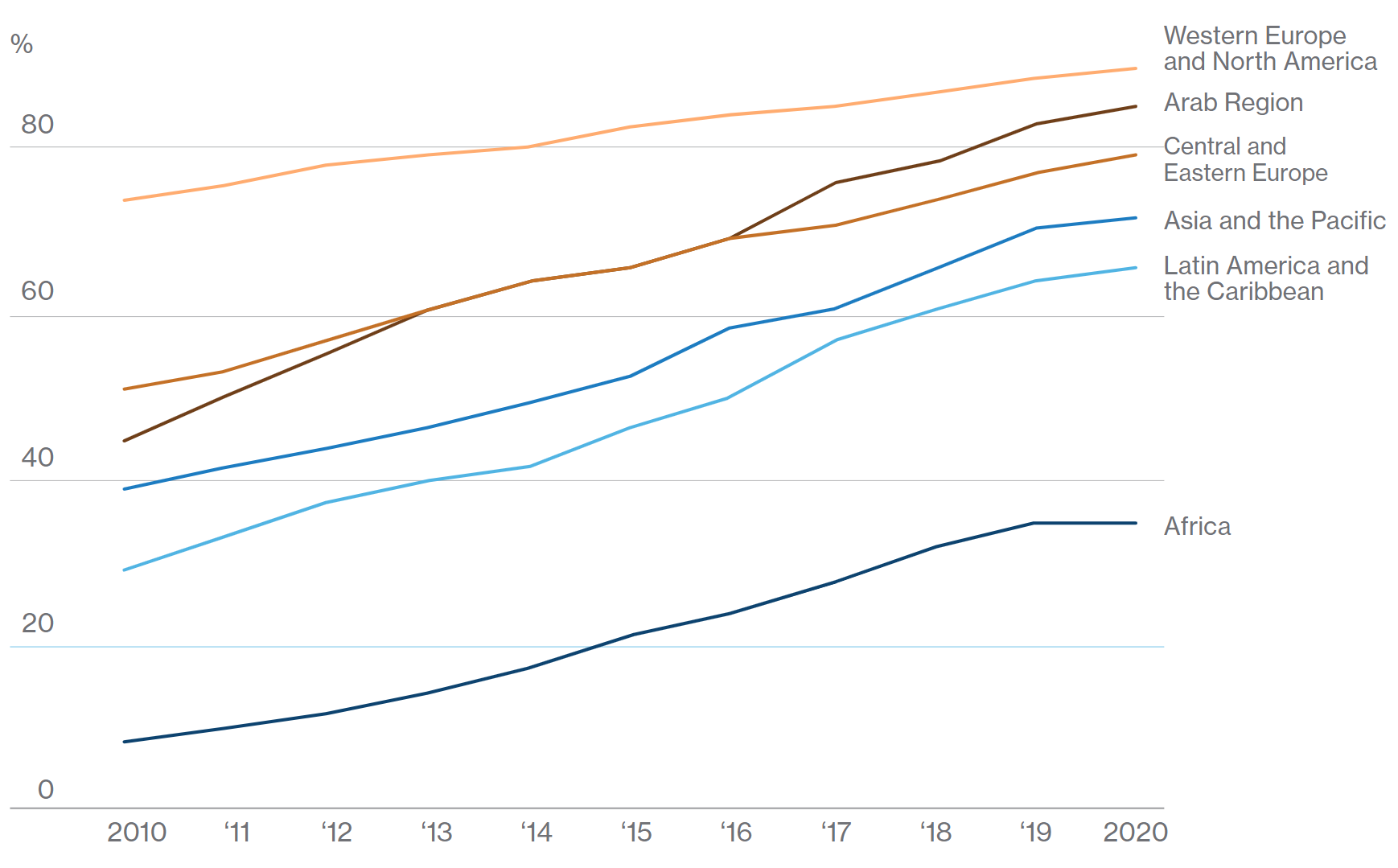
Internet penetration around the world

=== Internet and mobile ===
According to the UNESCO report on world trends in freedom of expression and media development, access to all types of media increased from 2.3 billion in 2016 to 4.2 billion in 2021. This allowed for greater access to content in general but not necessarily to journalistically curated one. International commitments such as the UN 2030 Agenda for Sustainable Development, the work of the Broadband Commission for Sustainable Development and the Internet Governance Forum’s intersessional work on ‘Connecting the Next Billion’ testify of this.

According to the International Telecommunications Union (ITU), 76% of the worlds population was using the internet in 2026, equivalent to approximately 6.3 billion people. However, about 2 billion people remained offline. Internet use also varied considerably by income level: 93% of people in high-income countries were online, compared to 32% of people in low-income countries.

==== Limitations ====
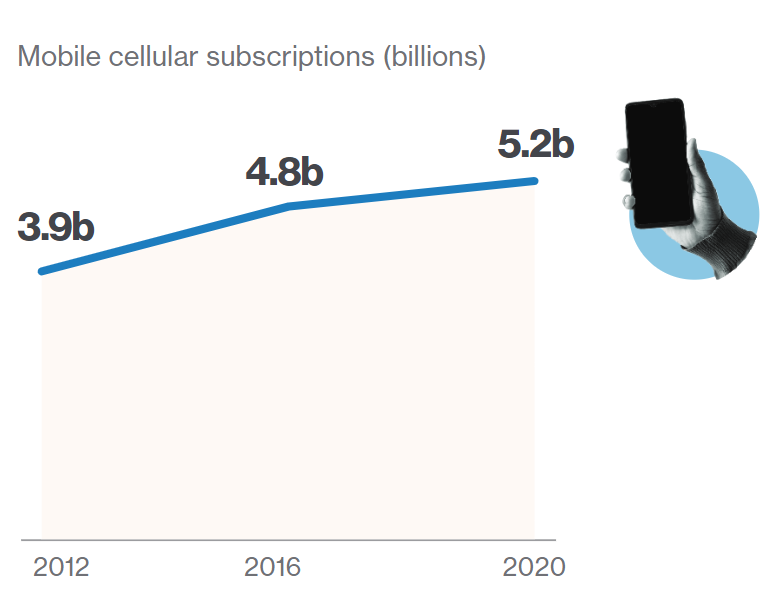
Global mobile cellular subscriptions

Mobile Internet connectivity has an impact in expanding access. The number of unique mobile cellular subscriptions increased from 3.89 billion in 2012 to 4.83 billion in 2016, and to 5.2 billion in 2020, two-thirds of the world's population. There are, however, noticeable inequalities in the access to internet. For instance, there is a "mobile gender gap", since women are 7% less likely than men to own a mobile phone. In Sub-Saharan Africa, the figure goes up to 13%. In terms of connectivity, women in Africa are 37% less likely to use mobile internet. Unlike the open web affords explorations beyond a user's immediate range of interests, Mobile Internet has the singularity of creating siloed information spaces predisposing mobile users to access only a limited portion of the available information. Censorship and surveillance are also factors of media pluralism as they cause different experiences for users accessing the Internet in different States.

==== Zero-rating ====
The limits that users face on accessing information via mobile applications coincide with a broader process of fragmentation of the Internet. Zero-rating, the practice of internet providers allowing users free connectivity to access specific content or applications for free, has offered some opportunities for individuals to surmount economic hurdles, but has also been accused by its critics as creating a ‘two-tiered’ internet. To address the issues with zero-rating, an alternative model has emerged in the concept of ‘equal rating’ and is being tested in experiments by Mozilla and Orange in Africa. Equal rating prevents prioritization of one type of content and zero-rates all content up to a specified data cap. Some countries in the region had a handful of plans to choose from (across all mobile network operators) while others, such as Colombia, offered as many as 30 pre-paid and 34 post-paid plans.

A study led by the Alliance for Affordable Internet (A4AI) of eight countries in the Global South found that zero-rated data plans exist in every country, although there is a great range in the frequency with which they are offered and actually used in each. Across the 181 plans examined, 13 per cent were offering zero-rated services. Another study, covering Ghana, Kenya, Nigeria and South Africa, found Facebook's Free Basics and Wikipedia Zero to be the most commonly zero-rated content.

=== Broadcast media ===
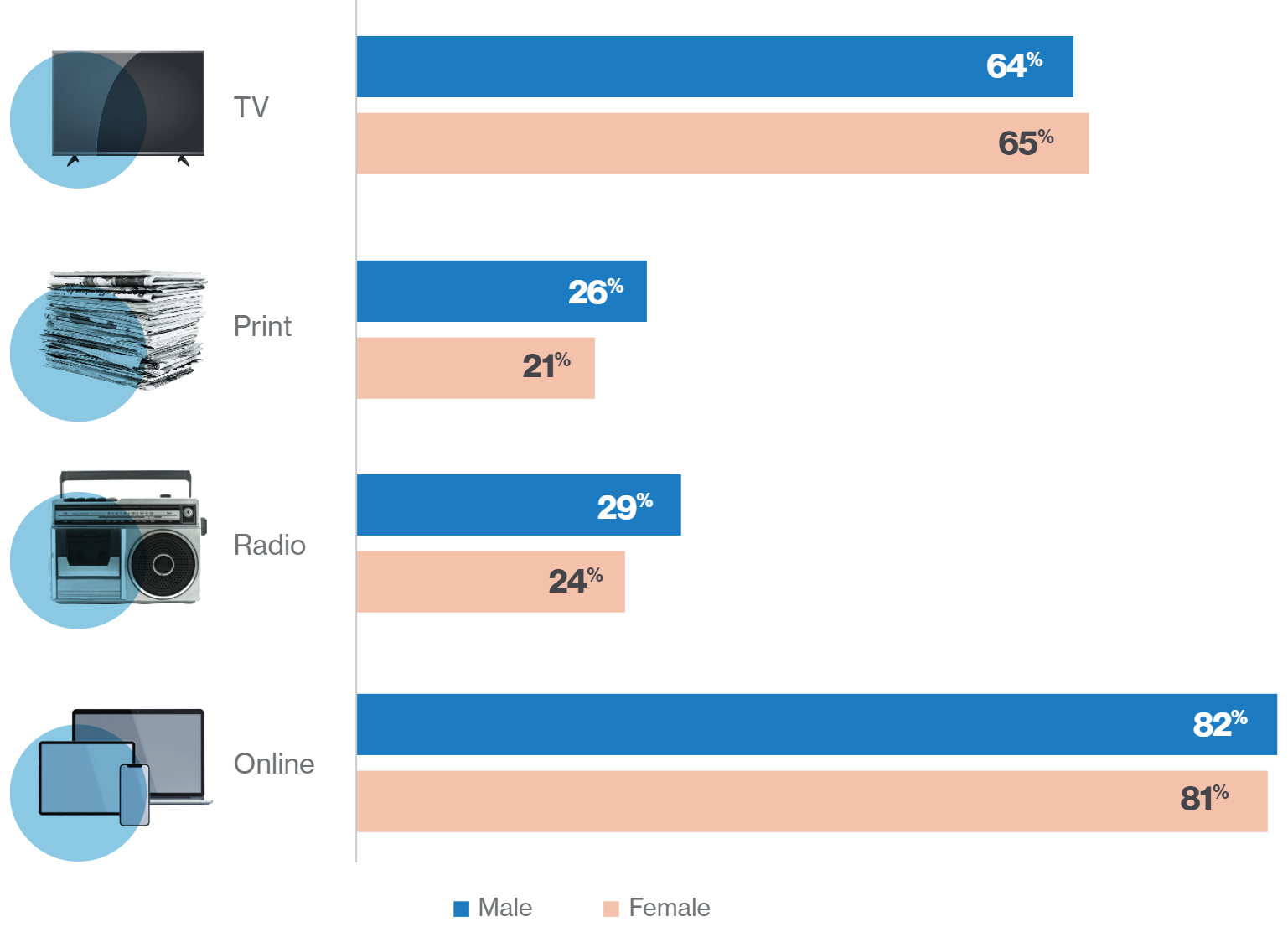
News consumers by medium, 2021

In Western Europe and North America, the primacy of television as a main source of information is being challenged by the internet, while in other regions, such as Africa, television is gaining greater audience share than radio, which has historically been the most widely accessed media platform. In the Arab region, geopolitical interests has contributed to the growing reach of state-owned global news broadcasters and has determined the launching of Arabic-language channels.

==== Generational trends ====
Age plays a profound role in determining the balance between radio, television and the Internet as the leading source of news. According to the 2017 Reuters Institute Digital News Report, in 36 countries and territories surveyed, 51 per cent of adults 55 years and older consider television as their main news source, compared to only 24 per cent of respondents between 18 and 24. The pattern is reversed when it comes to online media, chosen by 64 per cent of users between 18 and 24 as their primary source, but only by 28 per cent of users 55 and older. According to the Arab Youth Survey, in 2016, 45 per cent of the young people interviewed considered social media as a major source of news.

==== Digital transition ====
Digital transition is the process in which older analog television broadcasting is converted to and replaced by digital television. The International Telecommunication Union has been mapping the progress in digital switchovers across the globe. According to them, the switch from analogue television to digital television has been completed in 56 countries in 2017, and was ongoing in 68, steadily increasing the range of channels to which individuals have access.

Status of the transition to Digital Terrestrial Television Broadcasting

==== Expansion strategies ====
- Satellite television has continued to add global or transnational alternatives to national viewing options for many audiences. Global news providers such as the BBC, Al Jazeera, Agence France-Presse, RT (formerly Russia Today) and the Spanish-language Agencia EFE, have used the internet and satellite television to better reach audiences across borders and have added specialist broadcasts to target specific foreign audiences.
- Reflecting a more outward looking orientation, China Global Television Network, the multi-language and multi-channel grouping owned and operated by China Central Television, changed its name from CCTV-NEWS in January 2017.
- After years of budget cuts and shrinking global operations, in 2016 BBC announced the launch of 12 new language services (in Afaan Oromo, Amharic, Gujarati, Igbo, Korean, Marathi, Pidgin, Punjabi, Telugu, Tigrinya, and Yoruba), branded as a component of its biggest expansion ‘since the 1940s’.
- Also expanding access to content are changes in usage patterns with non-linear viewing, as online streaming is becoming an important component of users’ experience. Since expanding its global service to 130 new countries in January 2016, Netflix experienced a surge in subscribers, surpassing 100 million subscribers in the second quarter of 2017, up from 40 million in 2012. The audience has also become more diverse with 47 per cent of users based outside of the United States, where the company began in 1997.

=== Newspaper industry ===
The Internet has challenged the press as an alternative source of information and opinion but has also provided a new platform for newspaper organizations to reach new audiences. Between 2012 and 2016, print newspaper circulation continued to fall in almost all regions, with the exception of Asia and the Pacific, where the dramatic increase in sales in a few select countries has offset falls in historically strong Asian markets such as Japan and the Republic of Korea. Between 2012 and 2016, India’s print circulation grew by 89 per cent. As many newspapers make the transition to online platforms, revenues from digital subscriptions and digital advertising have been growing significantly. How to capture more of this growth remains a pressing challenge for newspapers.

==== Advertising issues ====
Print media is continuously affected by changing trends in advertising: in 2012 its share of total news media revenues globally dropped below 50 per cent and continued falling to 38 per cent in 2016. Newspapers transition to online platforms increase the volume of revenues from digital subscriptions and digital advertising. The main challenge that newspapers face, according to Cecilia Campbell, is how to capture more of the digital subscriptions and advertising growth.

=== European Union ===
The Media Pluralism Monitor developed by the Centre for Media Pluralism and Media Freedom (CMPF) and co-funded by the European Union was first implemented in 2014 and 2015 with subsequent pilot projects. In 2016, 2017 and 2020 the CMPF measured media pluralism within the EU, including some candidate countries with a methodology based on 4 areas, including: Basic Protection, Market Plurality, Political Independence and Social Inclusiveness.

== Economic models ==
Media systems are built from a variety of economic models including mixes of market, public service, community and state entities. A plurality of media owners and economic models serves as an essential element of external pluralism, guaranteed by competition in the market. Nonprofit public service and community media can help achieve internal pluralism by incorporating social and cultural diversity in the content they produce. Community media, drawing especially on volunteers, can be a unique source of local dialogue and information exchange. The lack of adaption and of efficient economic strategies from traditional media has led to proliferation of privately owned media. This involves a diversification of newspapers but may also affects quality journalism and media independence, especially with the financial contributions from "backers".

=== Pluralism in media ownership ===
Graz, Ots, and Sjøvaag (2024) studied newspapers in Sweden and found that ownership and market conditions can influence the range of political ownership and market conditions can influence the range of political viewpoints included in news coverage. This shows that having several news outlets doesn't always mean people are getting a wide variety of opinions. It is the way that outlets are owned and organized that make a difference.

==== State-owned media ====
In 2012, the Arab States Broadcasting Union (ASBU) counted 1,230 television stations broadcasting via Arab and international satellites, of which 133 were state-owned and 1,097 private. The reduction of government owned channels in the media sector is paralleled by a growth in outlets with a sectarian agenda. In some countries, private media outlets often maintain close ties to governments or individual politicians, while media houses owned by politically non-aligned individuals have struggled to survive, often in the face of advertising boycotts by state agencies. According to the European Broadcasting Union (EBU), public service broadcasting tend to struggle with funding and to decline since 2012.

==== Controlled liberalization ====
Media privatization and the lessening of the State dominance over media content is a global trend, according to the UNESCO report on world trends in freedom of expression and media development.

- Establishing profitable models of state-owned but relatively independent papers is part of the controlled liberalization process and is a common practice in the Asia Pacific region.
- State owned papers are top selling in Africa and the Arab region but often lack in reflecting society's plurality.
- Vertical integration and concentration in mature markets are found in Central and Eastern Europe, but they tend to lack transparency on ownership and of institutional safeguards with regard to pluralism (e.g. monitoring of concentration and regulatory intervention).
- Limits to concentration are clearly set out in Western Europe but they face lobbies from media actors who are able to loosen norms and the enforcement of the law.

==== New types of cross-ownership ====
Cross-ownership is a method of reinforcing business relationships by owning stock in the companies with which a given company does business. Drawing the line between the media and other industries is a challenge for new types of cross-ownership. The acquisition of the Washington Post by the founder of online retailer Amazon raised concerns about the newspaper independence, the newspaper has significantly increased its standing in the online media—and print—and introduced significant innovations.

==== Community-centered media ownership model ====
Most common in isolated, rural or disadvantaged areas community-centered media ownership is also mostly pertaining to radio. Through this model, not-for-profit media outlets are run and managed by the communities. They are also characterized as "independent and governed by and in the service of the communities they serve" and represent what UNESCO calls the "third pillar" of the media with commercial and public broadcasters.

=== Advertising, between old and new models ===
Internet advertising revenue 2012–2016

One of the challenges to traditional media is advertisement, which has evolved since 2010. According to the UNESCO report on world trends in freedom of expression and media development, between 2012 and 2016, revenues from advertisement in print have decreased by 27 percent in 2012, print advertising's share of total news advertising revenue was 48 per cent, falling to 38 per cent by 2016. Circulation of digital versions of traditional newspapers and digital advertisements have grown significantly, but have not been sufficient to offset losses in print. Once the transitioning phase from old media to digital media is over, revenues from digital advertisement tend to increase. This phenomenon pushed advertisers to pay premium prices to quality publications.

Tauel Harper considers that with the rise of big data, media have been seen to lose the "advertising subsidy" for journalistic content, through which "private" advertising paid for "public journalism". Big data analytics place their ads in front of individual media consumers regardless of the particular content they are consuming. This includes political advertising, which sometimes serves to bypass the significance of news in election contexts.

=== New platforms and business models ===
The New York Times in the United States, or the Mail & Guardian in South Africa use extensions or variations of existing schemes such as pay-walls created by publications considered to be of particularly high quality or addressing a particular niche.

The Guardian uses Wikipedia's borrowed strategy of frequently asking readers for donations in support to quality journalism or free content.

In various sectors, the number of crowdfunded journalism projects has increased significantly. While in 2012, 88 projects received funding through the platform, in 2015, the number of projects rose to 173, scattered across 60 countries (even if North America continues to register the majority of funded projects). The funds collected grew from $1.1 million in 2012 to $1.9 million in 2015.

Share of Internet advertising revenue by platform 2012–2016

Economic models also depend on larger structural reconfiguration of the market. While in 2012 advertising revenues from mobile represented a tiny portion of the market in the United States, in 2016 they surpassed revenues from all other platforms.

Media actors have also started testing new formats and technologies of journalism, experimenting with how virtual reality or gaming can facilitate immersive experiences of relatively distant events. In 2015 for example, the New York Times opened its Virtual Reality Lab, seeking to provide original perspectives on issues ranging from the war in Iraq, to the conflict in South Sudan, to the thinning of the ice cap in Antarctica. The Virtual reality app proved the most downloaded in the history of interactive applications launched by the paper. Awareness raising video games have also been developed such as Games for Social Change, which involve students.

== Content ==
According to Cisco Systems, in 2016 an average of 96,000 petabytes was transferred monthly over the Internet, more than twice as many as in 2012. In 2016, the number of active websites surpassed 1 billion, up from approximately 700 million in 2012.

=== User-generated content ===
Reaching two billion daily active users in June 2017, Facebook has emerged as the most popular social media platform globally. Other social media platforms are also dominant at the regional level such as: Twitter in Japan, Naver in the Republic of Korea, Instagram (owned by Facebook) and LinkedIn (owned by Microsoft) in Africa, VKontakte (VK) and Odnoklassniki in Russia and other countries in Central and Eastern Europe, WeChat and QQ in China.

However, a concentration phenomenon is occurring globally giving the dominance to a few online platforms that become popular for some unique features they provide, most commonly for the added privacy they offer users through disappearing messages or end-to-end encryption (e.g. WhatsApp, Snapchat, Signal, and Telegram), but they have tended to occupy niches and to facilitate the exchanges of information that remain rather invisible to larger audiences.

Production of freely accessible information has been increasing since 2012. In January 2017, Wikipedia had more than 43 million articles, almost twice as many as in January 2012. This corresponded to a progressive diversification of content and increase in contributions in languages other than English. In 2017, less than 12 per cent of Wikipedia content was in English, down from 18 per cent in 2012. Graham, Straumann, and Hogan say that increase in the availability and diversity of content has not radically changed the structures and processes for the production of knowledge. For example, while content on Africa has dramatically increased, a significant portion of this content has continued to be produced by contributors operating from North America and Europe, rather than from Africa itself.

Social media and video platforms have also become important channels for accessing news. The Reuters Institute's Digital News Report 2026 found that, across 48 markets, 54% of respondents used social media and video networks as a source of online news in the previous week, compared with 51% who used news organizations' own websites and apps. The report also highlights the growing role of online video and independent news creators in the digital news environment. These developments show how digital platforms influence the distribution of information and also how audiences encounter news and journalism.

=== Algorithms, echo chambers and polarization ===
The proliferation of online sources represents a vector leading to an increase in pluralism but algorithms used by social networking platforms and search engines to provide users with a personalized experience based on their individual preferences represent a challenge to pluralism, restricting exposure to differing viewpoints and news feed. This is commonly referred to as "eco-chambers" and "filter-bubbles".

With the help of algorithms, filter bubbles influence users choices and perception of reality by giving the impression that a particular point of view or representation is widely shared. Following the 2016 referendum of membership of the European Union in the United Kingdom and the United States presidential elections, this gained attention as many individuals confessed their surprise at results that seemed very distant from their expectations. The range of pluralism is influenced by the personalized individualization of the services and the way it diminishes choice.

Research on echo chambers from Flaxman, Goel, and Rao, Pariser, and Grömping suggest that use of social media and search engines tends to increase ideological distance among individuals.

Comparisons between online and off-line segregation have indicated how segregation tends to be higher in face-to-face interactions with neighbors, co-workers, or family members, and reviews of existing research have indicated how available empirical evidence does not support the most pessimistic views about polarization. A study conducted by researchers from Facebook and the University of Michigan, for example, has suggested that individuals’ own choices drive algorithmic filtering, limiting exposure to a range of content. While algorithms may not be causing polarization, they could amplify it, representing a significant component of the new information landscape.

The growing use of artificial intelligence (AI) also presents challenges for information integrity. UNESCO's 2025 World Trends report notes that the generative AI can expand content creation, but altered material can also spread at a rapid pace and disrupt the information environment. The report also highlights how the economic and political interests of the companies that develop and control these technologies can influence their effects on public discourse.

Part (2020) discusses how large digital platforms influence the way news and information are shared online. The European Commission (2022) also examines how online platforms can affect which news sources and viewpoints people come across. This shows that having more information available online does not always mean people are seeing a wider range of opinions.

=== Fake news ===
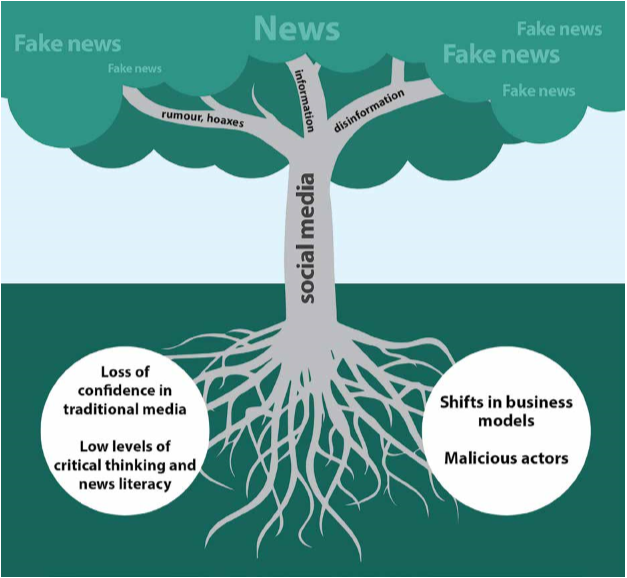
The roots of "fake news", UNESCO's report on thends in media

The term "fake news" gained importance with the electoral context in Western Europe and North America. It is determined by fraudulent content in news format and its velocity. According to Bounegru, Gray, Venturini and Mauri, fake news is when a deliberate lie "is picked up by dozens of other blogs, retransmitted by hundreds of websites, cross-posted over thousands of social media accounts and read by hundreds of thousands" that it then effectively becomes "fake news".

The evolving nature of online business models encourages the production of information that is "click-worthy" independently of its accuracy.

The nature of trust depends on the assumptions that non-institutional forms of communication are freer from power and more able to report information that mainstream media are perceived as unable or unwilling to reveal. Declines in confidence in much traditional media and expert knowledge have created fertile grounds for alternative, and often obscure sources of information to appear as authoritative and credible. This ultimately leaves users confused about basic facts.

Internet companies with threatened credibility tend to develop new responses to limit fake news and reduce financial incentives for its proliferation.

UNESCO's 2025 report on freedom of expression and media development identifies disinformation and declining media independence as challenges to access reliable information. The report emphasizes the importance of protecting independent journalism and strengthening information integrity so that people can access trustworthy information and make informed decisions.

=== Marginalized groups ===
The media covering of marginalized groups such as refugees tend to be influenced by and influence the political and social perceptions. While a large proportion of the European press initially articulated a sympathetic and empathetic response towards the humanitarian crisis caused by the conflict in Syria, according to Georgiou and Zaborowski, this sentiment was gradually replaced by suspicion and, in some cases, hostility towards refugees and migrants. Both the quality and tabloid press tended to employ ‘established, stereotyped narratives’ of security threats and economic costs. Gábor and Messing consider that a portion of the press, especially in Central and Eastern Europe, turned to systematic hostility towards migrants and refugees.

=== News players ===
Gate-keeping mechanisms continue to influence not only what is being communicated, but also who is given the opportunity to frame events. Citizens’ voices have indeed increased in new stories, individuals included in these stories tend to be treated, not as agents capable of asserting their world views and their interpretation of events, but rather as vox-pol, employed to add color to a narrative. Harlow and Johnson consider that in the case of protests, demonstrations or conflicts, established institutions and elites tend to prevail as news sources. Although novel media operations and actors have had a smaller impact on mainstream reporting, they have been instrumental in animating intermediate spaces, which aggregate content in ways that can reach broader audiences.

As users increasingly move from broadcast to online media to access information, the same large media institutions tend to predominate online spaces, even if filtered and mediated in much of their social media presence. A decade later, the majority of the most visited and viewed news websites remain traditional media outlets (CNN, New York Times, the Guardian, Washington Post, BBC), although news aggregation websites such as Reddit and Google News have emerged among the top five sites with the highest web traffic.

=== Media and information literacy ===
Authors Frau-Meigs, Velez, and Michel (2017) and Frau-Meigs and Torrent (2009) consider diversity in media can also be enhanced by media and information literacy (MIL). They argue that it can be useful in understanding the consequences of algorithms on modes of diffusion. Many types of MIL exist from information literacy, media literacy, news literacy, advertising literacy, digital literacy, media education, to digital and media literacy. A few initiatives already exist in the field:

- UNESCO launched in 2013 the Global Alliance for Partnerships on Media and Information Literacy (GAPMIL), as an "effort to promote international cooperation to ensure that all citizens have access to media and information competencies".
- The recent annual yearbook by the International Clearinghouse on Children, Youth and Media focuses on trends and opportunities for MIL in the Arab region.
- There have also been efforts to embed media and information literacy initiatives and requirements into legislation in countries such as Serbia, Finland, Morocco, the Philippines, Argentina, Australia and several states in the US have passed laws that address MIL.
- Education initiatives have been proliferating online reflecting a growth of MOOCs or massive online courses. Available on platforms such as Coursera and edX, as well as by public service broadcasters, these courses target both students and consumers of media, as well as teachers.
- There have also been a growing number of initiatives launched by internet companies to combat online hate speech or the proliferation of ‘fake news’, largely built on users’ inputs and support in flagging content that appears to not comply with a platform's terms of service.

== Gender equality ==
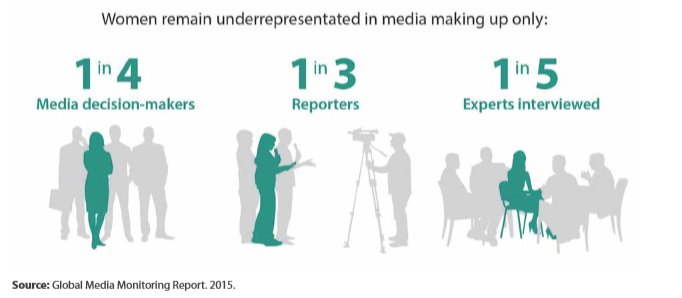
Invisible women? Gender equality in media content, decision-making and media workforce

Tuchman, Daniels, and Benoit (1978) use the term "symbolic annihilation" (originally credited to George Gerbner) to describe women's relationship to and visibility in mass media. According to the Global Media Monitoring Project's 2025 report, women made up 26% of people seen, heard, or spoken about in traditional news media, compared with 17% in 1995. On news websites, women represented 29% of people featured. The report found that progress toward gender in parity in news coverage has stalled a large amount since around 2010.

Regional and international organizations also recognize gender and media pluralism as often being problematic:

- In 2010, UNESCO developed a comprehensive set of Gender-Sensitive Indicators for Media, aimed at encouraging media organizations to benchmark themselves against equality criteria.
- In 2013, the Council of the European Parliament adopted the recommendation made by the European Institute for Gender Equality, that the media industry should adopt and implement gender equality indicators relating to women in decision-making, gender equality policies and women on boards.
- In 2016, UN Women launched a new partnership with major media organizations to draw attention to and act on eradicating all forms of inequalities. The Step it Up for Gender Equality Media Compact comprises a coalition of media outlets from around the globe.

=== The media workforce ===
According to Byerly, in many countries, as many women as men are graduating from media, journalism and communication degree programmes and entering the industry. In 1995, when the first substantial analysis of women media professionals across 43 nations was produced, women constituted around 40 per cent of the media workforce. A Global Media Monitoring Project (GMMP) 2015 report found that 31 per cent of stories on politics and 39 per cent of stories about the economy have female by-lines. Researchers from the US, Harp, Bachmann, and Loke, show that while women journalists are writing on a wider range of topics, they are still a minority of columnist at the major dailies. In terms of presenting on broadcast news, the 2015 GMMP found that the global proportion of women was 49 per cent, the same as in 2000 and two percentage points below the 1995 finding. Since 2005, the number of women working as reporters in broadcast news has dropped by four percentage points in television and radio.

Closer analysis shows that women were more numerous on television (57 per cent), for example, and less numerous on radio (41 per cent), where ‘looks’ are obviously far less important. The majority of younger presenters were women, but that trend reversed for older presenters, nearly all of whom were men. There were almost no women reporters recorded as older than 65. Part of this is likely due to recent improvements that have allowed more young women to enter the field, but it could also relate to the differences in how aging is perceived between men and women, as well as limitations in career advancement.

The Women's Media Center (WMC) 2017 report on women and the media in the USA shows that at 20 of the nation's top news outlets, women produced 37.7 per cent of news reports, an increase of 0.4 percentage points compared to 2016. In broadcast news, women's presence as anchors, reporters and field journalists actually declined by nearly seven percentage points between 2015 and 2016.

=== Women and decision-making ===
Gender equality in decision-making positions and on boards in media organizations in Europe

The Global Report on the Status of Women in the News Media found that women in media occupied just over a quarter of the jobs in top management (27 per cent) and governance (26 per cent) positions. The regions that fared best for women representation were Central (33 per cent) and Eastern Europe (43 per cent) and the Nordic countries (36 per cent). Elsewhere, women comprised only about a fifth of governance positions and held less than 10 per cent of top management jobs in Asia and the Pacific region. A major European project funded by the European Institute for Gender Equality (EIGE) found very similar findings: men held most of the senior management positions and board membership in 99 media houses across the European Union.

In the Asia and Pacific region, a joint report by the UNESCO Office in Bangkok, UN Women and the International Federation of Journalists (IFJ) Asia Pacific found women were significantly under-represented in decision-making roles. In Southern Africa, a Gender Links study found that women constitute 40 per cent of media employees and 34 per cent of media managers. The study also revealed that sexual harassment remains a key issue for women: just under 20 per cent of women media professionals said that they had personal experience of sexual harassment and the majority of those women said that the perpetrator was a senior colleague.

=== Representation ===
The 2015 GMMP made a comparison across 20 years of women's representation in the media and assessed that between 1995 (17 percent) and 2015 (24 percent), female appearances in television, radio and print rose by only seven percentage points. Sarah Macharia highlights the fact that where women most often appear in media, it is when they speak from personal experience (representing 38 per cent), while only 20 per cent of spokespersons and 19 per cent of experts featured in stories are women. Women featured in stories as 32 per cent of experts interviewed in North America, followed by the Caribbean (29 per cent) and Latin America (27 per cent). In the southern African region, Gender Links’ 2016 Gender and Media Progress Study covered 14 countries and found that women's views and voices accounted for a mere 20 per cent of news sources across Southern Africa media.

The Global Media Monitoring Project's 2025 report found that women and girls accounted for 26% of people seen, heard or spoken about in traditional news media, compared with 29% on news websites. The report analyzed news coverage in 94 countries and found that progress toward gender equality in news representation had largely stalled since around 2010. These findings suggest that the expansion of digital news media has not eliminated gender imbalances in media coverage.

=== The picture of women in media ===
- Women have won only a quarter of Pulitzer Prizes for foreign reporting and only 17 per cent of awards of the Martha Gellhorn Prize for Journalism. In 2015 the African Development Bank began sponsoring a category for Women's rights in Africa, designed to promote gender equality through the media, as one of the prizes awarded annually by One World Media.
- Created in 1997, the UNESCO/Guillermo Cano World Press Freedom Prize is an annual award that honors a person, organization or institution that has made a notable contribution to the defense and/or promotion of press freedom anywhere in the world. Nine out of 20 winners have been women.
- The Poynter Institute since 2014 has been running a Leadership Academy for Women in Digital Media, expressly focused on the skills and knowledge needed to achieve success in the digital media environment.
- The World Association of Newspapers and News Publishers (WAN-IFRA), which represents more than 18,000 publications, 15,000 online sites and more than 3,000 companies in more than 120 countries, leads the Women in the News (WIN) campaign together with UNESCO as part of their Gender and Media Freedom Strategy. In their 2016 handbook, WINning Strategies: Creating Stronger Media Organizations by Increasing Gender Diversity, they highlight a range of positive action strategies undertaken by a number of their member organizations from (Germany) to Jordan to Colombia, with the intention of providing blueprints for others to follow.
