= Community media =

Community media (or community broadcasting) refers to media organizations that are owned, controlled, and operated by and for a community, serving its specific interests. These media outlets can take various forms, including print, broadcast (radio and television), and online platforms, and typically operate on a non-profit basis. Community media are characterized by four core principles: community ownership and control, community service, community participation, and a non-profit model.

They often publish in local languages and rely on volunteer contributions, making them affordable and accessible. While traditionally associated with geographical areas, the concept of “community” has expanded to include communities of interest, such as women, LGBTQ+ groups, religious communities, and people with disabilities. This is especially evident in countries like South Africa and the Solomon Islands, where community media serve marginalized voices. Furthermore, virtual communities formed through social media platforms are increasingly seen as part of the community media landscape, provided they align with the core principles.

Community media play a crucial role in fostering media pluralism and supporting democratic functions such as voter education, particularly in reaching audiences that mainstream media may overlook. However, community broadcasting is often subject to regulations that prohibit political campaigning, necessitating careful oversight during election periods.

== Definition ==
Community media are forms of media that function in service of or are operated by a community. They include alternative, participatory and collaborative media practices that have developed in the context of community media, citizens' media and other forms of journalism outside mainstream media. They can provide access to or create local alternatives to mainstream broadcasting, including community newspapers, radio stations and magazines. Community Media aids in the process of building citizenship and raising social awareness. "Participation" and "access" are important aspects of community media. Those who create media are encouraged to provide a platform for others to express their views. Community media is often defined differently by different groups, but its broad range of forms can make the boundaries of the concept difficult to establish.

Community media are generally defined as a distinct sector of the media because of their independence, basis in civil society, and provision of a social service rather than a focus on profit. They serve as a third sector of the media alongside private and public media and provide communities with a platform to express their concerns about local issues, participate in democratic debate, and access reliable information. There is no consensus on a single definition, as each region has developed different forms of community media. Community media can also be considered mass media, although it generally serves a smaller and more localized audience than mainstream media.

== Modes of community media ==
Community media can take all the forms of other conventional media, such as print, radio, television, Web-based and mixed media.

Community radio is particularly widespread around the world with radio stations being founded to inform their listeners on issues important to the community.

Community television is a form of mass media in which a television station is owned, operated, or programmed by a community group to provide television programming focused on local interests.

== Grassroots media ==
Grassroots media is focused more specifically on media making by and for the local community that it serves making the discussion more narrow and precise. It is essentially a subset focusing on small scale media projects which aim to bring different visions and perspectives to the "codes", that are so easily embedded in the social psyche.

== Challenges ==
Despite the social service they provide through their focus on local issues, community media often face a number of challenges, including unfavourable regulation, censorship, unfair licensing processes, inequitable access to the frequency spectrum, lack of formal recognition, low funding, lack of skilled journalists and media professionals, and competition from private and state broadcasters.

== By region ==
=== United States ===
The first Public-access television station in the United States considered to be community media was set up in 1968 in Dale City, Virginia. It was managed by the city's Junior Chamber of Commerce and ran programming for two years without advertising. It closed due to lack of financing, equipment, and infrastructure. Another early example of community media is found in the counter-culture video collectives of the 1960s and 1970s.

Videofreex, Video Free America, and Global Village used new technologies to the benefit of community interests. In addition, the Raindance Corporation founded by Michael Shamberg, Paul Ryan, and others became known as "guerrilla television." The premise of guerrilla television was to non-violently blaze a new trail for the creation of media as an alternative to broadcast television. This initial activity was made possible by Sony's introduction of the video Porta-Pak.

==== Current status ====
Community media in the US does have some lobbying efforts. One of these is the Alliance for Community Media, which "works to protect the interests of [communitymedia centers]". They do not provide technical training for running multimedia operations rather, they work to support these centers through advocacy and education about what community media is. A major resource for those seeking access to community media in the United States was the Community Media Database. The Community Media Database acted as a directory for the community media companies located around the United States. Here, users could use the interactive map to find community media access in their area, as well as other resources on organizations whose focus is to advance the cause of community media within the country. The CMD appears to now be defunct. The Alliance for Community Media also represents local community groups, public schools, religious institutions, colleges and universities, government officials, second language communities, and national institutions (NASA, the US Department of Education, the US Army).To become a single member of the alliance one must pay a fee of $200. This fee is for those who work for the cause of Community Media and the ACM (e.g. staff, government officials, board directors). Supporters can pay a fee of only $50 and get membership to the regional group, single access to the ACM listserv, and discounted rates to ACM and Regional conferences and educational events. Examples of people who would get the supporter members are volunteers, students, and retirees. However anyone can sign up to get updates and newsletters from the ACM for free. An example of Community Media can be found in Washington, D.C., with a focus on the fight to gain statehood for D.C. One site for community media include the DCi Reporter which is an online website reporting D.C. area news and statehood news. Another is the public access, DCTV which has a wide variety of programming for D.C. residents, and also reports on D.C. statehood news.

The Benton Foundation is a non-profit organization founded by Charles Benton in 1981 to ensure that media "serves the public interest and enhances democracy". The foundation seeks to raise awareness and accessibility to community within the United States. They also have a strong focus on ensuring that media contents responsive and centralized to local communities.

=== Canada ===
Canada also has a central role in the development of community media and is by many considered the birthplace of community broadcasting. In the 1960s, the National Film Board of Canada set up a project called Challenge for Change which was a series of documentary films addressing socio-economic issues. Once again Sony's Porta-Pak proved revolutionary in Canada as well. In 1968, filmmakers Bonny Klein and Dorothy He`naut persuaded Challenge for Change to take on more local community issues. During the same year they trained members of the St. Jacques Citizens' Committee in video production. The committee went into the Montreal slums and captured interview footage with poor people and then presented the video in public meetings for discussion.

The history of community radio dates back to amateur radio organizations that formed in 1906. From a historical perspective, the seminal example of community radio is Lewis Hill's Pacifica Radio. KPFA in Berkeley, California began broadcasting in 1949 after acquiring an FCC license for FM spectrum. This first Pacifica station was funded through listener support and philanthropic foundations. Pacifica's mandate, that Hill expressed as "to engage in any activity that shall contribute to the lasting understanding between nations and between the individuals of all nations, races, creeds, and colors," has served to frame the community media movement through its historical and technological development.

=== China ===
Community media in China serves as a tool for the propaganda department to promote its ideologies. It is a strictly government operated media includes television, radio and newspaper. This refers to the unique historical condition (Tiananmen Square Protests) of a wealthy and powerful Communist Party-governed state that lacks democracy. The Communist Party governs everything and everyone, and answers to thing but itself. It stands above the law. WeChat has all the features of Facebook Messenger, the usefulness of Venmo and PayPal. Users can post Moments on their walls, order taxi service or movie tickets, and in general utilize the app not just for communication but for daily services. Anything that is posted on or is sent out to friends on WeChat are being monitored by the Chinese government.

"Sina weibo" is like a Chinese microblog. There are almost 540 million people are users of Sina weibo. It is a stage for people to post their comments, pictures, videos, articles and advertisements. Many celebrities use this stage to post advertisement and promote their brands. Not only the Chinese celebrities are using Sina weibo, there are Korean, Hollywood celebrities are communicating with their followers through this community platform.

=== Bangladesh ===
Community media are widely recognized by governments, international development agencies, and civil society organizations alike as key agents of participatory development. Their reach and practices are a unique way of reaching and involving people. This is particularly true of community radio, the most prevalent of all community media, which is a vital alternative both to state owned and commercial private radio. Community radio's affordability and reach make it a powerful agent of social change.

Recognition of community radio as a legitimate and key element in development efforts and the potential to empower marginalized and disenfranchised communities, has pushed a number of countries to introduce laws and regulations that acknowledge community radios as a distinct media sector. In those countries an enabling environment for community radios has been created.

Despite these advances, challenges persist at global and regional level and in their joint 2010 statement the four international special UN mandated rapporteurs on freedom of expression (*) expressed their concerns at the lack of specific legal recognition of the community broadcasting sector in licensing systems which are based on criteria that are appropriate to this sector as well as the failure to reserve adequate frequencies for community broadcasters or to establish appropriate funding support mechanism .

The Ministry of Information Government of People's Republic of Bangladesh has declared Community Radio Installation, Broadcast and Operation Policy 2008, which was the citizens' expectation since the year 1998. Accordingly, in April, 2010, Ministry of Information has approved 14 Community Radio Stations to operate for the first time in the country.

After the approval of license Bangladesh Telecommunication Regulatory Commission (BTRC) has allocated frequency and then the Community Radio stations started broadcasting from 2011.

Now 14 Community Radio Stations are on-air in the country, aiming to ensure empowerment and right to information for the rural community. They are broadcasting altogether 120 hours program per day on information, education, local entertainment and development motivation activities. Around 536 Youth Women & Youth are now working with those Stations throughout the country as rural broadcasters

These programs are quite supportive to the activities reflected in 6th 5-year plan of Government of Bangladesh, UN World Summit on the Information Society (UN WSIS) Action Plan, and UN Millennium Development Goals (UN MDGs) and UN Convention Against Corruption (UN CAC)

The success of the 1st batch of Community Radio stations has earned appreciation from all levels because of their commendable success. For that we give our thanks to those initiating organizations.

We are also giving thanks to the Ministry of Information that it is because of their good intention and sincere efforts which made possible a full-fledged community radio policy, the only one in South East Asia. India has got only a Guideline to operate Community Radio stations, while Nepal does not have any of this kind. In 2012 Ministry of Information has declared National Strategy for Community Radio to support implementation of Community Radio Installation, broadcast and Operation Policy.

Bangladesh NGOs Network for Radio and Communication is promoting the advocacy with the government in relations to community radio with other organizations since its emergence from 2000. BNNRC has been addressing the community radio and community TV access issue for over a decade, helping to bridge the information gap of rural Bangladesh.

The reality of today is that the bondage between the community people and local-level community radio stations are getting strengthened day-by-day. Community Radio has now become their part of life. Community Radio becomes the instrument for the livelihood battle of the rural people.

Bangladesh NGOs Network for Radio and Communication established the Community Media News Agency (CMNA), Community Media Academy (CMA) and Monthly Community Media to share development news & building capacity for the Community Media sector in Bangladesh.

We have now started advocacy with the Government of Bangladesh to open up Community Television for Development. We hope that, community television will come into being within a short time in Bangladesh.

In this context the present status of community radio stations regarding social, economic and institutional sustainability can be pointed as below:

Social Sustainability: i. Management Committee formed at 14 Community Radio station level ii. Advisory Committee formed for each station that included UNO and Additional District Commissioner iii. 2115 Listeners Clubs formed at CR Station level iv. The present number of CR listeners is around 46,47,000 v. People of 67 Upazila under 13 districts now listen Community Radio Programs

Sustainability at Govt. level: i. The Ministry of Information declared the Community Radio Installation, Broadcast and Operation Policy 2008. ii. The Ministry of Information prepared and declared the Community Radio Strategy 2012. iii. Digital Bangladesh Strategy Paper-prepared by the Prime Minister's Office. iv. Charter of Change 2008. Institutional Sustainability i. Presently 14 community radio stations are broadcasting from different stations. ii. Every day all the stations are broadcasting a total of 109 hours of programs. iii. Code of Conduct for Community Radio formulated. iv. Gender Policy for Community Radio prepared and published. iv. Human Resource Development Policy formulation for Community Radio Stations (in process). v. Financial Management Policy formulation (in process).

Economic Sustainability i. Non-Profitable business model (under process) ii. Funding of development partners iii. Facilitation of Initiating organization iv. Formulation and Implementation of Development Advertisement Policy v. Sharing allocation of local and national budget/s. vi. Community Radio Development Fund creation and operation.

Potentials of Community Radio in Bangladesh a. Community Radio has created scope for the poor and marginalized community to raise their own voice; it becomes the voice for the voiceless. This neo-media outlets opened scope to establish their rights of Information and communication in social, political, cultural and environmental arena.

b. Scope widened for poverty reduction and sustainable development because of the rights to raise voice of the community and accessibility to knowledge and information.

c. Scope opened for exchange of dialogue between local elected representatives, government and NGO professionals for the sake of establishing good governance.

d. Direct linkage established between the community and the main sectors reflected in MDGs and 6th 5-year plan.

e. Scope created for Social debate, inclusion and preservation of cultural diversity by ensuring the inclusion of the marginalized community.

f. Community Radio is now able to play more active role in Disaster Risk Reduction (DRR) due to establishment of effective linkage between the government departments and local/rural community.

Already the Community radio programs have been widely accepted among the local community. 14 community radio stations presently covers more than 4.6 million listeners.

The Community Radios are becoming an active ground for organizing dialogues at rural level. These dialogues will help the rural mass to find out their own voice and ensure leverage their free opinion in respect of social, economic, political, cultural and environmental issues

=== Europe ===
Community television and radio in Europe arose "from criticism of a monopolistic public service system that was considered out of touch". The experimental period of community media expression in Europe began in the 1970s after North American Public-access television was underway. It was therefore seen as a model but also understood that the media environments were structurally different.

A powerful community media example external to both North America and Europe is the Bolivian Miners' Radio of the 1940s. The station was established by the local miner's union and became an important tool for communication, resistance, and educational and cultural expression.

=== Chile ===
During the 1960s and 1970s, several catholic groups across Latin America drawing inspiration from liberation theology, formed their own community media projects from Patagonia to the Rio Grande. They explored several diverse technologies including theater, dance, puppets, mural paint, loudspeakers in their alternative media projects. One of the key figures in this media restructuring process was the Catholic Bishop Juan Luis Ysern and his communication project Radio Estrella Del Mar(REM), located on the archipelago of Chiloe in Southern Chile. REM was first conceived as a medium that serves the communities in the region of Chiloe. Started during the period of Pinochet dictatorship, REM produced several radio shows and news features and still continues to broadcast locally produced programmes by the communities 24 hours a day. The current director of REM, Miguel Millar says:

"The ultimate goal of the project is to ensure that both the administration of the radio and most of the programming stay under the control of the community."

== UNESCO ==
UNESCO released the Community Media Sustainability Policy Series to help community broadcasters overcome the obstacles they face in establishing and sustaining their operations. This series presents the following recommendations put forward by stakeholders and participants at an international seminar for Community Media Sustainability: Strengthening Policies and Funding event held by UNESCO in 2015 to promote a healthy policy environment:

Definition of community broadcasting: community broadcasters should be defined by their independent nature, community governance and focus on issues of local concern.

Formal recognition: community broadcasters should be considered separate from private and state media in a country's laws and given the same protection afforded to other media.

Licensing: a country should ensure that licensing procedures are fair and transparent, as well as less demanding than the process for commercial media.

Spectrum: a minimum percentage of the broadcasting spectrum should be reserved for community media use.

Provision of public funding: countries should ensure that a continued source of funding is provided for community broadcasters to apply for to increase their sustainability.

Access to Private Funding and Support: community broadcasters should be allowed the right to utilize private sources of funding, such as income through advertising.

Digital provisions: countries should ensure that community media can access and afford opportunities in the digital space.

== Minorities ==
Minorities are typically underrepresented in community media in the United States, according to a 2015 study by the American Society of News Editors and the School of Journalism and Mass Communication at Florida International University. Genia Stevens has stated that by "creating a space where minority communities have the tools to spread their message to a larger audience, community media provides a platform that allows authentic relationships to develop, grow and thrive".

Minorities of all ages can benefit from engaging in community media. The skills to create their own media, through video, photo and audio recording can be made available for those wishing to directly engage and provide their community with media. When it comes to engagement, there can be those who engage and follow the community media, and also those who learn the necessary skills to produce community media. These skills can be learned by different minority groups and this education can provide numerous opportunities.

== See also ==
- Community radio
- Community television
- Editorial independence
- Independent media
- International broadcasting
- Press freedom
- State media
