= Communication rights =

Right to freely communicate

Communication rights involve freedom of opinion and expression, democratic media governance, media ownership and media control, participation in one's own culture, linguistic rights, rights to education, privacy, assemble, and self-determination. They are also related to inclusion and exclusion, quality and accessibility to means of communication.

The right to communicate (or "seek, receive and impart information") is noted in Article 19 of the Universal Declaration of Human Rights.

A "right to communicate" and "communication rights" are closely related, but not identical. The former is more associated with the New World Information and Communication Order debate, and points to the need for a formal legal acknowledgment of such a right, as an overall framework for more effective implementation. The latter emphasizes the fact that an array of international rights underpinning communication already exists, but many are often ignored and require active mobilization and assertion.

== History ==
The concept of the right to communicate began in 1969 with Jean D’Arcy, a pioneer in French and European television in the 1950s and by 1969 Director of the United Nations Radio and Visual Services Division, where he was involved in international policy discussions arising out of the recent innovations in satellite global communications. He recognized that the communication rights relating to freedom of expression embodied in the U. N. Universal Declaration of Human Rights (UDHR) adopted in 1948 would need to be re-examined in the context of global, interactive communication between individuals and communities. He called for the need for the recognition of a human right to communicate that would encompass earlier established rights. He thus was the first to link communication and universal human rights. His call was taken up by academics, policy experts, and public servants who evolved into the Right to Communicate Group, the many non-governmental and civil society organisations that made up the Platform for Co-operation on Communication and Democratisation, and the Communication Rights in the Information Society (CRIS) Campaign.

The first broad-based debate on media and communication globally, limited mainly to governments, ran for a decade from the mid-1970s. Governments of the South, by then a majority in the UN, began voicing demands in UNESCO concerning media concentration, the flow of news, and ‘cultural imperialism’. The MacBride Report (1981) studied the problem, articulating a general ‘right to communicate’. The debate was compromised, however, by Cold War rhetoric, and fell apart after the US and the UK pulled out of UNESCO.

The MacBride Report became unavailable until the World Association for Christian Communication (WACC) sponsored its republication in 1988. WACC held the secretariat of the CRIS Campaign 2000–05.

Interest in the right to communicate languished during the 1980s as there was no mass movement to promote it for the simple reason that few people had direct experience with interactive communication over global electronic networks. This situation changed dramatically in the 1990s with a cluster of innovations that included the Internet, the World Wide Web, search engines, availability of personal computers, and social networking. As more people participated in interactive communication and the many challenges it raised in regard to such communication rights as free speech, privacy, and freedom of information, they began to develop a growing consciousness of the importance of such rights to their ability to communicate.

A result of this growing communicative consciousness is a renewed research interest in and political advocacy for a right to communicate (see references). From the 1990s onwards, NGOs and activists became increasingly active in a variety of communication issues, from community media, to language rights, to copyright, to Internet provision and free and open source software. These coalesced in a number of umbrella groups tackling inter-related issues from which the pluralistic notion of communication rights began to take shape, this time from the ground up.

More recently, the International Journal of Speech-Language Pathology published a special issue on communication rights stating "Communication rights address both "freedom of opinion and expression" and rights and freedoms "without distinction of … language" (United Nations, 1948)" The special issue addressed communication rights from four perspectives: (1) communication rights of all people; (2) communication rights of people with communication disabilities; (3) communication rights of children and (4) communication rights relating to language. The Universal Declaration of Communication Rights (International Communication Project, 2014) has been signed by over 10 000 people and states: "We recognise that the ability to communicate is a basic human right. We recognise that everyone has the potential to communicate. By putting our names to this declaration, we give our support to the millions of people around the world who have communication disorders that prevent them from experiencing fulfilling lives and participating equally and fully in their communities. We believe that people with communication disabilities should have access to the support they need to realise their full potential."

== Four pillars ==
Each Pillar [of Communication Rights] relates to a different domain of social existence, experience and practice, in which communication is a core activity and performs key functions. The rational [sic] for the four [pillars is,] that each involves a relatively autonomous sphere of social action, yet depends on the others for achieving its ultimate goal - they are necessary interlocking blocks in the struggle to achieve communication rights. Action can be coherently pursued under, each, often in collaboration with other social actors concerned with the area more generally; while bridges can and must be built to the other areas if the goal is to be achieved.

=== Communicating in the public sphere ===
"The role of communication and media in exercising democratic political participation in society. But while the fake and concocted news are broadcast by different media to take the financial favor of the state is highly dangerous. This tendency is developed in 21st century irrespective of any nations around the world. And the legal provision and its implementation part is also very much weak and governed by the will of the state. Free and fair journalism does not refer and mean to publish and broadcast untrue and purposefully concocted news."

=== Communication knowledge ===
"The terms and means by which knowledge generated by society is communicated, or blocked, for use by different groups."

=== Civil rights in communication ===
"The exercise of civil rights relating to the processes of communication in society."

=== Cultural rights in communication ===
"The communication of diverse cultures, cultural forms and identities at the individual and social levels."

== Right to communicate vs. communication rights ==
A ‘right to communicate’ and ‘communication rights’ are closely related, but not identical, in their history and usage. In the Cold War tensions of the 1970s and 1980s, the former became associated with the New World Information and Communication Order (NWICO) debate; thus, efforts within UNESCO to formulate such a right were abandoned. The latter emphasizes the fact that an array of international rights underpinning communication already exists, but many are too often ignored and require active mobilisation and assertion. While some, especially within the mass media sector, still see the right to communicate as a "code word" for state censorship, the technological innovations in interactive electronic, global communication of recent decades are seen by others as challenging the traditional mass media structures and formulations of communication rights values arising from them, thereby renewing the need to re-consider the need for a right to communicate.

== See also ==
- Communication
- Data transmission
- Cross-cultural communication
- Intercultural communication
