= Gender Equality Index =

European socioeconomic index

The Gender Equality Index is a tool to measure the progress of gender equality in several areas of economic and social life in the EU and its Member States, developed by the European Institute for Gender Equality (EIGE). These areas are summarised into a hierarchical structure of domains and sub-domains. The Index consists of 31 indicators and ranges from 1 to 100, with 100 representing a gender-equal society. The aim of the Index is to support evidence-based and informed decision-making in the EU and to track progress and setbacks in gender equality since 2005. Additionally, it helps to understand where improvements are most needed and thus supports policymakers in designing more effective gender equality measures.

The EU Gender Equality Strategy 2020–2025 acknowledges the Index as a key benchmark for gender equality in the EU and sets out its intention to introduce annual monitoring of gender equality, building on the Gender Equality Index.

The first Gender Equality Index was published in 2013, followed by 2015 and 2017. Since 2019 the Index is published annually and contains two parts. While the first part displays the scores of the domains, the second part has a different dedicated thematic focus each year. Apart from the Gender Equality Index report, EIGE also publishes country factsheets with dedicated analyses of scores and indicators for every EU Member State.

== Domains ==
The Gender Equality Index is a composite measure which consists of six core domains – work, money, knowledge, time, power, and health – counting towards the Index score. The core domains are further divided into 14 sub-domains capturing key gender-equality issues in the respective area. Two additional domains – violence and intersecting inequalities – belong to the Index structure. They are not included in the core Index, because they focus on specific phenomena that apply only to a selected group of the population.

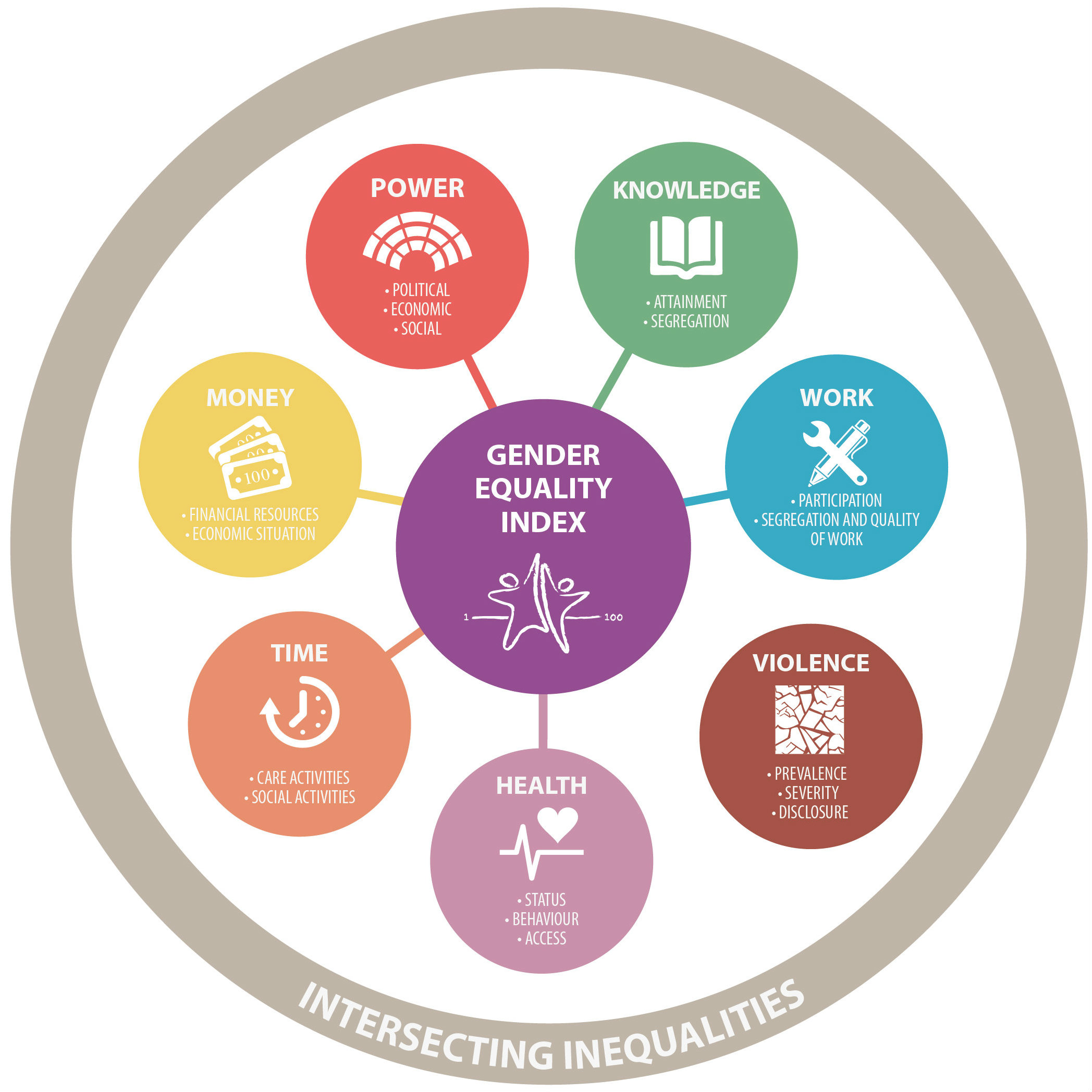
The core and additional domains of EIGE's Gender Equality Index

The conceptual framework is presented in the first edition of the Index and was updated in 2017.

The Gender Equality Index is calculated using the main EU-wide surveys and data collection covering all the EU Member States. Data sources include Eurostat (education statistics, European Union Labour Force Survey, European Health Interview Survey, European Union Statistics on Income and Living Conditions, Structure of Earnings Survey), Eurofound (European Working Conditions Survey, European Quality of Life Survey), and EIGE (Women and Men in Decision-Making).

=== Core domains ===
==== Work ====
The domain of work compares the position of women and men in the European Union's labour market. It measures gender gaps in participation in the labour market, sectoral segregation patterns and quality of work (such as flexibility of working time and career prospects).

==== Money ====
The domain of money examines inequalities in financial resources and the economic situation of women and men. It measures gaps in earnings and income, as well as the risk of poverty and income distribution.

==== Knowledge ====
The domain of knowledge shows differences between women and men in terms of education and training. This domain measures gaps in participation in tertiary and lifelong education as well as segregation in educational fields.

==== Time ====
The domain of time measures inequalities in the allocation of time that women and men spend on different activities. It measures gender gaps in the involvement of women and men in caring for their children or grandchildren, older people and people with disabilities, as well as their involvement in cooking and housework in comparison to time spent on social activities.

==== Power ====
The domain of power measures gender equality in decision-making positions across the political, economic and social spheres. The sub-domain of political power examines the representation of women and men in national parliaments, government and regional/local assemblies. The sub-domain of gender balance in economic decision-making is measured by the proportion of women and men on corporate boards of the largest nationally registered and national Central banks. The Index also presents data in the sub-domain of social power, which includes data on decision-making in research-funding organisations, media and sports.

==== Health ====
The domain of health measures gender equality in three health-related aspects: health status, healthy/unhealthy behaviour and access to health services. Health status looks at the differences in life expectancy of women and men together with self-perceived health and healthy life years. This is complemented by a set of health behaviour factors, based on recommendations from the World Health Organisation on healthy behaviour, namely fruit and vegetable consumption, physical activity, smoking and alcohol consumption. Access to health services is measured by the percentage of people who report unmet medical and/or dental needs.

=== Additional domains ===
==== Intersecting inequalities ====
Since women and men are not homogeneous groups, this domain looks at other characteristics that may affect gender equality. Five social factors or ‘intersections’ were selected for further investigation: family type, age, country of birth, disability, and education. This allows for analysis of the situation of different sub-groups separately as well as gender gaps within these groups. From a policy perspective, it becomes possible to identify which groups of women and men are least/most disadvantaged and to indicate further better-targeted policy measures.

==== Violence ====
The domain of violence provides a set of indicators that can assist Member States in assessing the extent and nature of violence against women and enable the monitoring and evaluation of the institutional response to this phenomenon. To provide the most complete and reliable picture of violence against women in the EU, a three-tier structure of measurement was defined including: (1) a set of indicators on the extent of violence against women that will form the composite measure; (2) a set of additional indicators covering a broader range of forms of violence against women; (3) a set of contextual factors, which can provide insights on some of the causes and circumstances surrounding violence against women.

== Thematic focus ==
The 2022 Index has a thematic focus on the COVID-19 pandemic and care. Based on EIGE's survey on the socioeconomic consequences of the COVID-19 pandemic on gender equality with over 40 000 respondents across the EU, the focus explores the division of informal childcare, long-term care (LTC) and housework between women and men. Conducted in June and July 2021, the survey also looks at the pandemic's impact on working arrangements, access to services, work-life balance and the well-being of carers.

The 2021 Index thematic focus on Health explores gender differences in three dimensions – health status (including mental health), health behaviours and access to health services. It also provides a gender and intersectional analysis of sexual and reproductive health and the COVID-19 pandemic.

The thematic focus of the 2020 Gender Equality Index examines Digitalisation and the future of work from a gender perspective. It discusses patterns in the use of new technologies, the digital transformation of the world of work and broader consequences of digitalisation such as artificial intelligence or online harassment in a work setting and their respective gender implications.

The first thematic focus in the 2019 edition of the Gender Equality Index centers on Work-life balance. It cuts across three broad areas: paid work, unpaid work (care), and education and training by providing indicators in six specific areas: parental leave policies; informal care for older adults or people with disabilities, as well as long-term care services; caring for children and childcare services; transport and public infrastructure; flexible working arrangements; and lifelong learning.

== Results ==
In 2022, the Gender Equality Index score for the EU is 68.6 points out of 100, a 0.6‑point increase since the 2021 Index and only 5.5 points higher than in 2010. This marks an advance but at a slow pace. Progress in gender equality is largely driven by the domain of power, which conversely has the greatest gender inequalities in the EU. Without this domain, the Index score would have fallen due to the impact of the COVID-19 pandemic. For the first time since its inception, the Gender Equality Index is recording decreases in scores in the domains of work and knowledge with higher gender inequalities in employment (full-time equivalent employment rate (FTE) and duration of working life), education (tertiary graduation and participation in formal or informal education and training) as well as health status and access to health services. Gender gaps in the risk of poverty and the distribution of income between women and men have remained constant.

== Criticism ==
The Gender Equality Index has been criticized for not including the gender-equality of conscription.

== Reports ==
- Gender Equality Index 2022: The COVID-19 pandemic and care
- Gender Equality Index 2021: Health
- Gender Equality Index 2020: Digitalisation and the future of work
- Gender Equality Index 2019: Work-life balance
- Intersecting inequalities: Gender Equality Index (2019)
- Gender Equality Index 2017: Measuring gender equality in the European Union 2005-2015
- Gender Equality Index 2017: Measurement framework of violence against women – Report
- Gender Equality Index 2015: Measuring gender equality in the European Union 2005–2012
- Gender Equality Index 2013
