= Programmed =

Programmed may refer to:

- Programmed (Innerzone Orchestra album), 1999
- Programmed (Lethal album), 1990

== See also ==
- Program (disambiguation)
