= Lethal (American band) =

American heavy metal band

- Origin: Hebron, Kentucky, U.S.
- Genres: Progressive metal, power metal, heavy metal
- Years active: 1982–1996, 2006–present
- Labels: Massacre, Metal Blade
- Members: Tom Edward Mallicoat; David McElfresh; Glen Cook; Jerry Hartman; Dell Hull; Chris Brown
- Past members: Adrian Powers; Eric Cook; Brian Goins; Jay Simpson; Chuck Gollar

Lethal is an American heavy metal band from Hebron, Kentucky, formed in 1982 by brothers Eric Cook and Glen Cook.

== History ==
The band was formed by brothers Eric and Glen Cook along with Jay Simpson the original drummer and Brian Goins the original singer, Brian came up with the name Lethal. Lethal also added a second guitarist, Chuck Gollar in 1982. Gollar was replaced by Dell Hull in 1983.

Lethal decided they wanted a different style of vocals and in 1984, Brian Goins was released and Tom Mallicoat was asked to come aboard. Lethal made one appearance with the line up consisting of Tom Mallicoat, Eric Cook, Glen Cook, Dell Hull and Jay Simpson. A second show was planned but was canceled due to circumstances beyond the band's control.

In 1985, Lethal went into the studio to record "The Arrival". The songs were recorded however, at the time the band was set for the final mix down, Simpson, for personal reasons decided to leave the band. Lethal completed the mix down using Simpson's drums. After Simpson's departure Lethal added drummer, Adrian Powers. Lethal would return to the studio, and with Powers on drums, re-record "The Arrival". It was released in 1987.

In 1988, Lethal began negotiating a record contract and after an agreement was reached and it was time to sign the contract, Adrian Powers had a change of heart and was reluctant to sign, not wanting to commit to touring. Eric Cook placed a call to Jay Simpson to see if he would consider coming back. Simpson, who was recently married, declined. (Eric Cook was a groomsman at Simpson's wedding.) In 1988, Lethal added Jerry Hartman on drums. Then in 1993 shortly after parting ways with guitarist Dell Hull, David McElfresh was approached to play guitar for Lethal who brought a substantial amount of writing to the next recording entitled "Your Favorite God" and a good bit more for the full length "Poison Seed" released on Massacre Records in 1996.

The band has since released two studio albums, one EP and a music video of the song Immune from the first album. In 2003 Tom Mallicoat was seeking for musicians to form a new band. In 2006 Lethal reunited with Your Favorite God lineup, and started rehearsing for upcoming live dates, as well as writing material for their new album. The album was never released. They played their first show in ten years in Chicago 2007 Powerfest They also played in Keep It True festival in 2007, on Bang Your Head!!! in the same year and on Headbangers Open Air in 2008. Programmed was reissued on 1997. The band's sound is often compared with Queensrÿche and Crimson Glory.

On August 23, 2012, founding member Eric Cook died from cancer.

== Band members ==
Current members

- Glen Cook – bass (1982–1996, 2006–present)
- Dell Hull – guitar (1983–1991, 2016–present)
- Tom Edward Mallicoat – vocals (1984–1996, 2006–present)
- Jerry Hartman – drums (1988–1996, 2006–present)
- David McElfresh – guitars (1991–1996, 2006–present)
- Chris Brown – guitars (2013–present)

Former members

- Chuck Gollar – guitars (1982–1983)
- Adrian Powers – drums (1985–1988)
- Eric Cook – guitars (1982–1996, 2006–2012; died 2012)
- Brian Goins – vocals (1982–1984)
- Jay Simpson – drums (1982–1985)

== Discography ==
=== Albums ===
- 1990 – Programmed
- 1996 – Poison Seed

=== Demos ===
- 1987 – The Arrival
- 1991 – Demo

=== Extended plays ===
- 1995 – Your Favorite God
