= Programmed (Lethal album) =

Studio album by Lethal
- Released: June 1990
- Genre: Power metal, progressive metal, heavy metal
- Length: 46:33
- Label: Metal Blade Records
- Producer: James Palace

Lethal chronology
Programmed (1990)	Poison Seed (1996)

Professional ratings
Review scores
Source	Rating
Rock Hard	9/10

Programmed is the first album by American heavy metal band Lethal, released in 1990 by Metal Blade Records.

== Reception ==
In 2005, Programmed was ranked number 414 in Rock Hard magazine's book of The 500 Greatest Rock & Metal Albums of All Time.

== Track listing ==
1. "Fire in Your Skin" – 5:40
2. "Programmed" – 3:59
3. "Plan of Peace" – 2:57
4. "Another Day" – 6:16
5. "Arrival" – 4:20
6. "What They've Done" – 5:42
7. "Obscure the Sky" – 3:58
8. "Immune" – 4:58
9. "Pray for Me" – 3:07
10. "Killing Machine" – 5:36

== Personnel ==
- Tom Mallicoat – vocals
- Eric Cook – guitar
- Dell Hull – guitar
- Glen Cook – bass
- Jerry Hartman – drums
