= World Association for Christian Communication =

International NGO

The World Association for Christian Communication (WACC) is an international NGO registered as a charity in Canada and the United Kingdom. The organization's mission is to promote communication rights as a pillar of social change and sustainable development.

Founded in 1968, WACC partners with grassroots civil society organizations in some 35 countries each year. WACC has members in 120 countries. Members are organised into eight Regional Associations (Africa, Asia, Caribbean, Europe, Latin America, Middle East, North America and Pacific). The WACC is a member of the ACT Alliance and has a consultative status with the United Nations.

== History ==
The origins of WACC date back to 1950 when Christian communicators from Europe and North America began seeking guidelines for the future of religious broadcasting. Several organisations, including the World Council of Churches, shared the same concerns and they eventually joined forces to establish the 'old' WACC in 1968. Rapid developments in mass media worldwide and a concern to integrate the work of the Agency for Christian Literature Development of the World Council of Churches led to a merger in 1975 that created the present WACC. In 1986 WACC adopted its Christian Principles of Communication as a statement of core values based on liberation theology's option for the poor; the principles were updated in 2009.

WACC's Theory of Change articulates how a focus on communication - as a right, as a practice, as a skill and as a profession - is fundamental to achieving dignity, inclusion, and informed and active participation, essential to sustainable development and just and peaceful communities.

== Activities ==
WACC's wide-ranging activities include support for communication projects mainly, but not exclusively, in the global south; the promotion of analysis, reflection and action on important topics related to its areas of concern; support for networking within and beyond its membership; and publication and sharing of information; indigenous, gender and human rights. WACC's project support has traditionally been largely of a responsive nature. WACC's largest single activity is The Global Media Monitoring Project (GMMP) a worldwide longitudinal study (1995, 2000, 2005) on the representation of women in the world's media. The fifth research in the series was conducted in 2015 by hundreds of volunteers in 114 countries around the world. The next GMMP was published in 2020 and covered over 30,000 media stories from 116 countries.

WACC, which celebrated its 50th anniversary in 2018, has been instrumental in developing the concept of Communication Rights and their relationship to participatory development communication. WACC launched a Centre for Communication Rights, to promote materials on several communication related issues, including digital civil rights.

== See also ==
- ACT Alliance – Global alliance of more than 145 churches and related organisations
- List of organizations with consultative status to the United Nations Economic and Social Council
- Riad Jarjour – Syrian clergyman and former director of the WACC
- The Global Media Monitoring Project – a project of the WACC
