= Symbolic annihilation =

Critical theory terminology

Symbolic annihilation was first used by George Gerbner in 1976 to describe the absence of representation, or underrepresentation, of some group of people in the media (often based on their race, sex, sexual orientation, socioeconomic status, etc.), understood in the social sciences to be a means of maintaining social inequality. This term is usually applied to media criticism in the fields of feminism and queer theory to describe the ways in which the media promotes stereotypes and denies specific identities. Gaye Tuchman (1978) divided the concept of symbolic annihilation into three aspects: omission, trivialization and condemnation. This multifaceted approach to coverage not only vilifies communities of identity, but work to make members invisible through the explicit lack of representation in all forms of media ranging from film, song, books, news media and visual art.

"Representation in the fictional world signifies social existence; absence means symbolic annihilation." (Gerbner & Gross, 1976, p. 182)

Tuchman states in the Mass Media book for A-level students on page 109 that women are represented far less than males on TV. Tuchman also stated that when women have roles, they are mostly negative.

== Symbolic or "gentle" violence ==
Sociologist Pierre Bourdieu described symbolic annihilation as a form of subtle violence which disregards the legitimacy of an identity. A society is susceptible to the media it consumes and the social norms as depicted by the media can be instructive to consumers as a model of behavior toward the minority group. Invisibility or negative portrayal of minorities in media denies their existence in society. The result is that familiarity and behavioral codes are not well established and interaction is characterized by differences between groups.

== Feminist argument ==
Since the 1970s, scholars of feminism have used the concept of annihilation to express the effects misrepresentation and/or absence of women and girls in mass media has had on their ability to find secure employment, advance in the workplace, and create unique identities. Lisa P. Hebert notes that media are "crucial in the construction and dissemination of gender ideologies, and thus, in gender socialization".

Many such scholars argue that mainstream depictions of women and girls result from dominant racial, gender, and class ideologies. These ideologies, when skewed from reality, distort representation into demeaning stereotype or trivializing portrayals. Feminist theorists argue that such flawed media representations further distort the viewer's conceptualization of women, their role in a society, and how one interacts with them. The ultimate cost of this pattern, to feminist scholars, is the symbolic erasure (or annihilation) of positive and empowered female role models in popular media. Women who consume these media, over a period of years, are said to internalize oppression through giving merit to stereotype.

Hebert, in speaking about the effects of misrepresentation and symbolic annihilation of black females, describes the stereotype that is depicted in mainstream media and often adopted by female viewers:

"In addition to the black body ideal of large breasts, thin waist and round buttocks presented in videos, many of the black women featured depict a Westernized beauty ideal of lighter skin, long hair, and blue or green eyes. Racist and sexist thinking informs the way color-caste hierarchies affect black females."

Dr. Marty Klein writes that for such women to conform to the stereotypical norms depicted in mass media, to be an acceptable female, many feel they "have to carefully modulate, and therefore undermine, their own sexuality".

== Gay and lesbian argument ==
Like feminist scholars, gays and lesbians also argue that the misrepresentation of LGBT people in mainstream media has bolstered negative treatment towards many self-identified LGBT individuals in the last century. Media educators Larry Gross and George Gerbner argue that "the commercial structure of the mass media limits the opportunity for representing diverse characters". Many similar scholars and activists feel entertainment media networks and film companies avoid portraying openly LGBT characters in the plots of prime-time shows and big-budget films for fear of alienating or offending advertisers, investors, and audiences who remain loyal to heteronormativity.

Many LGBT activists posit profit motives scare away openly LGBT characters from scripts or advertising imagery due to the perceived repercussions or backlash of heterosexuals in the media consumer market.

=== Latest trends ===
However, in recent years many television shows and Hollywood films are featuring prominent gay or lesbian characters, which are oftentimes white. The popularity of shows like Will & Grace and Queer Eye for the Straight Guy as well as films like Brokeback Mountain illustrate that networks are increasingly willing to feature gay characters, as long as produced content draws high ratings, and generate profits for advertisers during show hours. Some, like Ramin Setoodeh of the Daily Beast, note many media executives are forcing popular straight gay-for-pay to ensure and accomplish these profits. Openly gay and lesbian actors like Neil Patrick Harris or Portia de Rossi often play straight roles to ensure heterosexual audience comfort, further annihilating depictions of LGBT reality from media.

This profit-motivation means that networks are careful in their portrayals of gay and lesbian characters. While Will & Grace does feature two openly gay male characters, the content lacks discussion about gay romance or intimacy. The two gay characters are merely friends, never depicted as lovers, and are rarely shown engaging in sexual relations with other males. The primary focus of their depictions are as friends to the heterosexual female characters on the television broadcast.

== See also ==
- Critical theory
- Larry Gross
