= The Global Media Monitoring Project =

The Global Media Monitoring Project (GMMP) is the largest international study of gender in the news media and falls under the World Association for Christian Communication (WACC). It is also an advocacy organization that aims to change the representation of women in the news media. Every five years since 1995, the GMMP collects data on indicators of gender in the news, such as the presence of women, gender bias, and stereotyping. The most recent study, conducted in 2015, encompassed 114 countries.

== History ==
The idea for a media monitoring project was created at the Women Empowering Communication international conference in Bangkok in 1994. The WACC, along with MediaWatch (Canada), took up the project. They had several key goals:

- To map the representation and portrayal of women in the world’s mainstream news media
- To develop a grassroots research instrument
- To build solidarity among gender and communication groups worldwide
- To create media awareness
- To develop media monitoring skills on an international level

Coverage

The 1995 Report covered 71 countries and was conducted by volunteers over the span of one day. Consequent studies took place in 2000, covering 70 countries; in 2005, covering 76 countries; in 2010, in 108 countries; and in 2015, in 114 countries. All of the monitoring and compiling of reports is carried out by volunteers. GMMP reports have been presented at the Women’s NGO Forum in Beijing (1995), the UN Beijing + 5 (2000), a parallel session at the Commission on the Status of Women 2010 session, and in the 100 Women BBC series 2015 "Is News Failing Women?".

== 2015 Report ==
The 2015 Project covered 22,136 news items, 26,010 news personnel, and 45,402 total news subjects in newspaper, radio, television, internet news, and news media tweets. The research discussed news subjects, personnel, and content through the framework of media accountability to women.

News Subjects

The report discovered that progress towards gender parity in the news has almost ground to a halt over the period 2010 to 2015: Women make up only 24% of the persons heard, read about, or seen in newspaper, television, and radio news, exactly as they did in 2010. Over the past two decades, the gender gap in people in the news has narrowed most dramatically in Latin America by 13 percent. Women are three percent less visible in political news stories now than five years ago. They comprise 38% of people interviewed on the basis of personal experience compared to 31% in 2005. North America has the highest percentage of women experts in the news (32%), followed by the Caribbean (29%) and Latin America (29%). In 2015, progress towards news representation that acknowledges women's participation in economic life remained elusive: while women in the real world hold at least 40% of paid employment globally, in the news world only 20% of the workers in the formal labor force are women, while 67% of the news world's unemployed and stay-at-home parents are women. Portrayals of women as survivors of domestic violence have risen by more than four times across the period 2005 to 2015.

Reporters and Presenters

The 2015 GMMP detected what appears to be a global glass ceiling for female news reporters as far as they are visible in newspaper bylines and newscast reports. Women have consistently reported only 37% of the news over the past decade, from 2005 to 2015. Women as news reporters are most present on radio, at 41%, and least in print news, at 35%. Younger presenters on screen are predominantly female, but the scales tip dramatically at 50 years old when men begin to dominate the news-anchoring scene. At 65 years and older, women disappear from the screen as reporters and presenters.

News Content

9% of stories overall contain references to legal rights or policy frameworks, with social and legal stories making the highest contribution to the global average. A rights angle is barely present in political and economic stories. 97% of political stories in Asia, and 98% of economic stories in the Pacific region and the Middle East perform poorly on the rights-focus yardstick. 14% of stories by female reporters focus centrally on women, in contrast to 9% of stories by their male counterparts. 9% of stories evoke gender equality or inequality issues, more than double the percentage documented in 2005. Only 4% of stories clearly challenge gender stereotypes, a one percent change since 2005.

Digital News

Women's relative invisibility in traditional news media has crossed over into digital news delivery platforms: Only 26% of the people in internet news stories and media news tweets combined are women. Women report five percent more stories online than in the traditional mediums combined: 42% of online news is reported by women. Gender difference in source selection by female and male reporters becomes starker in online news: Women are 33% of sources in stories by online news' female reporters, compared to 23% in stories by men. Only 4% of news media tweets clearly challenge gender stereotypes, exactly similar to the overall percentage of print, radio, and television stories that challenge such stereotypes.

== 2020 Report ==
The GMMP released its 2020 report in November of 2021, marking the culmination of the 6th GMMP project.

== Implications ==
The GMMP 1995 - 2015 findings paint a picture in which unequal gender power relations are entrenched and validated and in which gender stereotypes are replicated and reinforced by the world's news media.

That the patterns of underrepresentation, misrepresentation, and invisibilization of women have continued into the digital news world show that the problem is deeply entrenched in the mainstream news media system irrespective of the platform through which news is channeled.

== See also ==
- Media and gender – Relationship between mass media and gender
- Media bias – Bias within the mass media
- World Association for Christian Communication – International NGO – the parent organization of the GMMP
