= European Institute for Gender Equality =

European Union agency

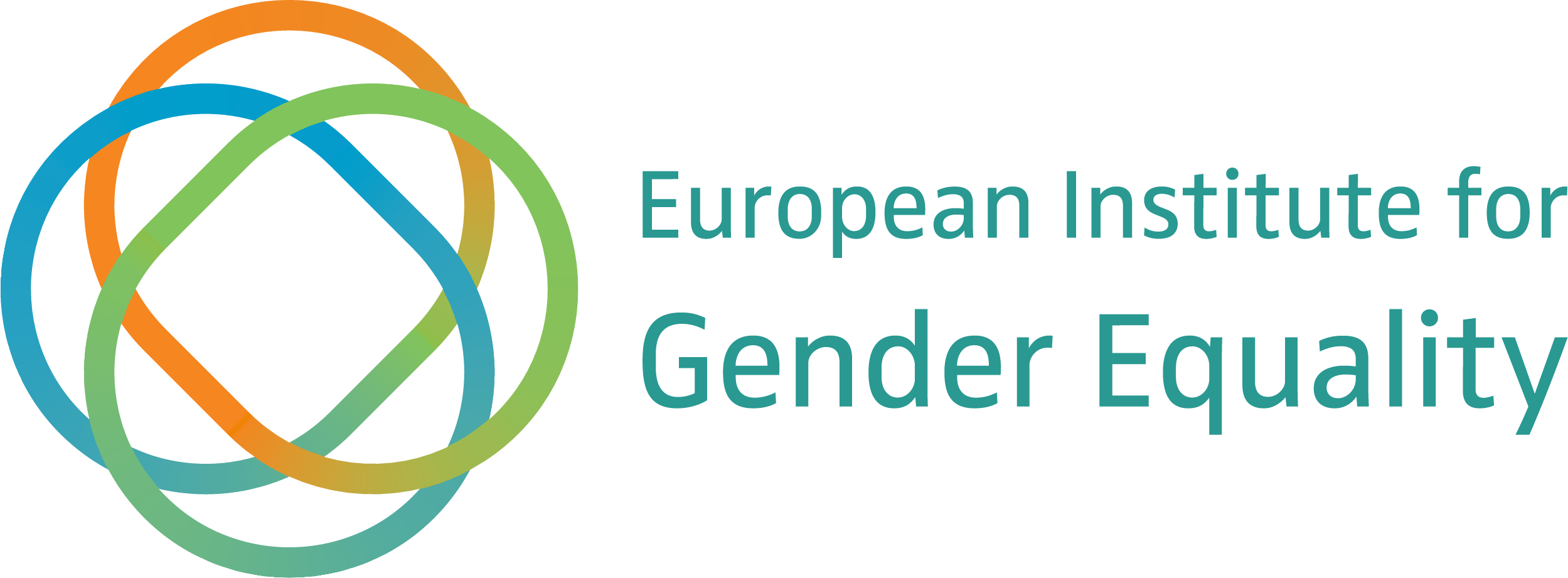
- Formation: 20 December 2006 (ratified); 2007 (established)
- Location: Vilnius, Lithuania
- Director: Carlien Scheele (since February 2020)
- Website: EIGE website

The European Institute for Gender Equality (EIGE) is the European Union's agency for gender equality.

In accordance with Regulation (EC) No.1922/2006 the Agency was founded on 20 December 2006 and is located in Vilnius, Lithuania. The Agency has a small office in Brussels that liaises with European institutions.

Gender equality is a fundamental right under the Treaty of Lisbon and represents one of the EU's priority policy areas. However, an existing gender gap in private and professional life persists in the EU.

In this respect, EIGE promotes gender equality and eliminating discrimination based on gender.

== Mission ==
EIGE's mission is to assist in gaining equality between men and women and help people achieve equal opportunities.

The Agency supports EU institutions and Member States in designing inclusive and transformative measures to promote gender equality in all areas of life. This requires close cooperation with stakeholders and hope-based communication of data, evidence and other expertise to raise awareness at national and European levels.

Among its tasks, the Agency:

- delivers research, collects and analyses data to reduce the gender gap and balance gender inequality;
- measures gender equality, within an intersectional perspective;
- develops tools to improve gender statistics and data collection and to combat gender-based violence and discrimination;
- provides technical support for gender mainstreaming in all EU and national policies.

The Agency underwent two External Evaluations. The second external evaluation concluded that EIGE has successfully established itself as EU knowledge centre for gender equality

== Organization Structures ==
EIGE is part of the network of the EU and more specifically of the Justice and Home Affairs (JHA) agencies. Its tasks and objectives are delegated by the European Council and the European Parliament. A Management Board is appointed for 3 years to adopt the annual work plan, and the Agency's budget. The management board consists of 18 representatives of the Member States as well as a representative of the European Commission.

In addition, the Experts' Forum supports the Agency as an advisory body and provides expertise in the field of gender equality. Members are designated for a period of three years.

The Agency works in close cooperation with EU institutions and agencies, Member States and EU candidate countries. Social partners, civil society organizations academia, research centres, experts and equal opportunities organizations and media are among its other stakeholders.

== EIGE's work ==
EIGE's work offers a resource for policy-making.

To guarantee support and expertise, reliable and comparable data are a precondition for data collection. However, different methods and definitions, such as the term "violence", make reliable data collection more difficult. For this reason, the Agency analyses country-specific situations and can launch recommendations to improve data collection and reporting.

== Highlights and focus areas ==
=== Gender Statistics Database ===
The Gender Statistics Database is a comprehensive resource for gender statistics. It informs and shows data on various aspects of (in)equality between men and women, with the purpose of supporting the measurement of whether and to what extent gender equality has been achieved.

The Gender Statistics Database covers a wide range of indicators, including employment, education, health, and violence, allowing analysis and comparison. It is regularly updated and facilitates informed decision-making and policy development.

=== Gender Equality Index ===
The Gender Equality Index is a measurement tool developed by the Agency for the first time in 2013. It helps policymakers track and improve gender equality across the EU.

It measures the progress in gender equality across Member States on a cumulative summary measure ranging from 1 (full inequality) to 100 (full equality) and it gives visibility to areas that need improvement

The Index has 6 core domains:

- Power
- Time
- Knowledge
- Health
- Money
- Work.

31 gender indicators are summed up according to the framework concept, to understand and compare the state of inequalities and their impact on people's life.

While no score is given to the EU in the domain of violence, due to a lack of comparable EU-wide data, the Agency is tasked with data collection to support the prevention, protection of victims and the prosecution of perpetrators and integrated policies.

The Index includes an intersectional approach, addressing phenomena occurring in specific population groups. It goes beyond gender analysis, to explore inequalities related to age, education, disabilities and family type. The intersectional lens captures the diverse experiences and challenges characterizing different groups and provides a comprehensive understanding of broader gender equality issues.

The Index compares the complex topic of gender equality across the Member States and addresses.Each year a Thematic Focus is established for a deeper gender analysis in specific areas.

The Gender Equality Index determines what is needed to improve to achieve gender equality: it shows that "the EU still has a lot of room for improv[ing] [...] equality between men and women".

=== Gender mainstreaming ===
The agency has created a broad variety of step-by-step guidance to redress gender inequalities in policies, services, and public sectors, such as education, health, and employment. This process involves analysing the different effects policies have on women and men, consulting with gender equality experts, and ensuring that gender equality objectives are incorporated into all levels of decision-making.

EIGE has developed various toolkits and reports, such as the Gender Impact Assessment Toolkit and the Gender Budgeting Toolkit, to support the implementation of gender mainstreaming, ensuring comprehensive and systematic inclusion of gender considerations in policymaking.

=== Gender-based violence ===
The agency provides evidence on gender-based violence, throughout its data collection and reports on topics such as cyber violence, and female genital mutilation. Also, it supports EU and Member States in their efforts to lessen violence and to shape measures to combat gender-based violence.

=== Implementation of Beijing Platform for Action ===
The Beijing Platform of Action is a commitment at the United Nations level entered by the EU, which was adopted at the Fourth World Conference on Women in 1995. The project is an agenda for the empowerment of women.

EIGE provides support to the Precedencies of the Council of the EU, which may select one of the 12 areas and initiates a closer examination.

Overall, this affects 12 areas in which the engagement is supported. These areas are

1. Women and the environment
2. Women in power and decision making
3. The girl child
4. Women and the economy
5. Women and poverty
6. Violence against women
7. Human rights of women
8. Education and training of women
9. Institutional mechanisms for the advancement of women
10. Women and health
11. Women and the media
12. Women and armed conflict.

EIGE's data collection provides a sound base for political recommendations. In 2025 the Agency publishes its 'Beijing +30 report'.

== EIGE's Outreach and Engagement ==
=== Stakeholders' relations and engagement ===
EIGE actively engages with the Presidencies of the Council of the EU, by providing research, data collection and technical assistance to support gender equality priorities during the Presidency term. This collaboration allows for gender considerations are integrated into the council's work, and it reinforces the EU's addressment gender equality across all policy areas.

The purpose of EIGE's strategic foresight is to investigate future challenges and opportunities in areas where achieving gender equality remains a challenge. Key themes to consider are and they analyse how gender issues affect people at home, at work or in society.

This forward-looking strategy helps stakeholders integrating a gender perspective in their long-term planning and decision-making, ensuring that gender equality remains a central focus in evolving societal contexts.

=== EIGE's Gender Equality Forum ===
EIGE's Gender Equality Forum is a international event to advance gender equality and close gender gaps through concrete solutions. The forum brings leaders, activists, organizations and young people to discuss issues affecting gender equality in the EU. It creates space for debates, masterclasses, workshops and inspirational talks with a broad audience of policy makers, civil society organizations, human rights defenders and artists. A spot is reserved for young people, who are encouraged to join and share their views to actively contribute to the development of future strategies for gender equality in the EU.

The first edition of the forum, in 2022, set the stage for European commitment to engage in the steps to advance progress in gender equality.

The Gender Equality Forum 2024 focuses on two thematic strands:

- taking stock of gender equality in Europe: now and beyond 2025
- tackling gender-based violence in the EU: persisting and emerging challenges and how to address them.

The event is held in Brussels and online in English, with International Sign Language interpretation for selected sessions onsite and online.

=== Campaigns ===
The Agency attempts to raising awareness on the positive impact of gender equality and the concrete benefits it brings to people. Throughout hope-based communication, the Agency shift the narrative towards opportunities and shared values of gender equality and inspires concrete actions to make equality real.

EIGE uses campaigns to attempt to promote equality between men and women.

The Equality 24/7 campaign represents an ongoing effort to sustain gender equality as a core value in European society.

The campaign aims to advocate for an inclusive society. Equality 24/7 has been launched before the European Parliament Elections, to encourage individuals, and policymakers, to put gender equality on the political agenda to guide actions and decisions.

Also, the campaign is steering towards the Agency's second Gender Equality Forum 2024, which raises awareness about the importance of considering gender equality in all areas of life.

Meanwhile, The European Green Deal: Three Steps Forward campaign aligns gender equality with sustainability goals and climate actions under the European Green Deal. The campaign was launched in March 2023, with the purpose of emphasizing how gender-sensitive policies can drive the green transition, ensuring that climate actions benefit everyone equally.

It focuses on three key areas:

- Ensuring equal access for women to opportunities in green economy
- Addressing gender-specific impacts of climate change
- Promote women's leadership in environmental decision-making.

In 2022, the Agency launched its #SafeSpaces campaign to address and eradicate gender-based violence both offline and online.

By promoting physical and digital safe spaces, the Agency aims to both raise awareness and change behaviours of offline and online activities, through the implementation of policies to safeguard the wellbeing of women and girls in the EU.

#SafeSpaces aligns with the UN "Orange the World" campaign, a 16-day of activism initiative to combat gender-based violence.

== See also ==
- Gender equality
- Gender Equality Index
- Gender inequality
