= Cyrus Fernandez =

Filipino voice actor, musician and writer

- Citizenship: Filipino
- Education: Bachelor's Degree in Development Communication
- Alma mater: College of Development Communication, University of the Philippines Los Baños
- Occupations: Radio DJ, Music Manager, Events Host, Events Producer, Voice Actor
- Employer(s): DZLB FM, NU 107
- Organization(s): UPLB Jocks, Audio Heavy Entertainment
- Call sign: Castor; Cyrus The Virus (NU107); Chase (DZLB FM)

Cyrus Fernandez is a Filipino voice actor, musician, writer, and radio personality best known for his extensive recording work for the Filipino language dub of various international television programs, and for having been one of the rock jocks who were in the last DJ lineup of Manila's now-defunct rock radio station NU 107. During his days with NU107 and UPLB Campus Radio station 97.4 DZLB FM, Fernandez variedly used the pseudonyms Cyrus The Virus, Castor, and Chase.

He served as lead vocalist of the Filipino Rock/Power Metal band Exillion until the band went on hiatus in 2010. He is still involved in bands albeit not in the front lines, having taken on the responsibility of being an artist agent. He currently works with bands Giniling Festival, Segatron, and Game Theory. He founded Audio Heavy Productions in 2010.

A native of Los Baños, Laguna, Fernandez received a bachelor's degree in Development Communication with a major in broadcasting from the College of Development Communication at the University of the Philippines Los Banos. It was here that Fernandez first became a DJ, serving as a jock for 97.4 DZLB FM, taking on the pseudonym "Chase."

Musician wunderkind Sega Alcabasa formed the band Exillion in 2009, and decided to recruit Fernandez as front man for the band because Alcabasa thought his high-noted singing would be most apt for the band's sound.

He currently writes music-related articles for news websites, and is part of Dig Radio, an online radio station put up by former NU 107 jocks.
