= Development communication =

Use of communication to facilitate social development

Development communication refers to the use of communication to facilitate social development. Development communication engages stakeholders and policy makers, establishes conducive environments, assesses risks and opportunities and promotes information exchange to create positive social change via sustainable development. Development communication techniques include information dissemination and education, behavior change, social marketing, social mobilization, media advocacy, communication for social change, and community participation.

Development communication has been labeled as the "Fifth Theory of the Press", with "social transformation and development", and "the fulfillment of basic needs" as its primary purposes. Jamias articulated the philosophy of development communication which is anchored on three main ideas. Their three main ideas are: purposive, value-laden, and pragmatic. Nora C. Quebral expanded the definition, calling it "the art and science of human communication applied to the speedy transformation of a country and the mass of its people from poverty to a dynamic state of economic growth that makes possible greater social equality and the larger fulfillment of the human potential". Melcote and Steeves saw it as "emancipation communication", aimed at combating injustice and oppression. According to Melcote (1991) in Waisbord (2001), the ultimate goal of development communication is to raise the quality of life of the people, including; to increase income and wellbeing, eradicate social injustice, promote land reforms and freedom of speech

== Definition ==
Development communication was first articulated on 10 December 1971 at the University of the Philippines Los Baños, during a symposium held by the university's College of Agriculture in honour of plant breeder Dioscoro L. Umali. Quebral later defined it as the art and science of human communication applied to a society's planned shift from poverty to dynamic socio-economic growth, one that promotes greater equality and allows individuals to fulfil their potential.

Other definitions emphasize different aspects. Erskine Childers described "development support communications" as a discipline within development planning that accounts for human behavioural factors when designing projects and their objectives. UNICEF describes it as a two-way process of sharing ideas and knowledge that empowers individuals and communities to act to improve their lives.

== History ==
The practice of development communication began in the 1940s, but widespread application came about after World War II. The advent of communication sciences in the 1950s included recognition of the field as an academic discipline, led by Daniel Lerner, Wilbur Schramm and Everett Rogers. Both Childers and Quebral stressed that DC includes all means of communication, ranging from mass media from people to people.

According to Quebral (1975), the most important feature of Philippines-style development communications is that the government is the "chief designer and administrator of the master (development) plan wherein, development communication, in this system then is purposive, persuasive, goal-directed, audience-oriented, and interventionist by nature".

== Academic schools ==
Various schools of development communication arose in response to challenges and opportunities in individual countries. Manyozo (2006) broke the field into six schools. The "Bretton Woods" school was originally dominant in international literature. The others were the Latin American, Indian, African, Los Baños and participatory schools.

=== Catholic social change ===
While not per se an academic school, the Church has been conducting "development communication" for many decades. The Catholic Church's social teachings and moral norms parallel those of social development. Rerum novarum (On the New Things), for example, an encyclical written in 1891 by Pope Leo XIII critiqued social ills and promoted "the Catholic doctrine on work, the right to property, the principle of collaboration instead of class struggle as the fundamental means for social change, the rights of the weak, the dignity of the poor and the obligations of the rich, the perfecting of justice through charity, on the right to form professional associations" In 1961, Pope John XXIII, writing on the topic "Christianity and Social Progress", produced an encyclical entitled Mater et magistra (Mother and Teacher), which taught that the "Church is called in truth, justice and love to cooperate in building with all men and women an authentic communion. In this way, economic growth will not be limited to satisfying men's needs, but it will also promote their dignity". Then in 1967, Pope Paul VI published Populorum Progressio(Progressive Development). In it the Pope underscored the importance of justice, peace, and development by declaring that "development is the new name of peace". Addressing development workers, he said, "genuine progress does not consist in wealth sought for personal comfort or for its own sake; rather it consists in an economic order designed for the welfare of the human person, where the daily bread that each man receives reflects the glow of brotherly love and the helping hand of God". The importance of engagement for social transformation and development is also asserted in the Catechism of the Catholic Church.

=== Bretton Woods ===
The Bretton Woods school of development communication paralleled the economic strategies outlined in the Marshall Plan, the Bretton Woods system and of the World Bank and the International Monetary Fund in 1944. The little-used name served to differentiate the original paradigm from other schools that evolved later. Leading theorists included Daniel Lerner, Wilbur Schramm and Everett Rogers. Due to his pioneering influence, Rogers was referred to as "one of the founding fathers of development communication."

This approach to development communication was criticized by Latin American researchers such as Luis Ramiro Beltan and Alfonso Gumucio Dagron, because it emphasized problems in the developing nation rather than its unequal relation with developed countries. They claimed that it proposed industrial capitalism as a universal solution and that many projects failed to address obstacles such as lack of access to land, agricultural credits, and fair market prices.

Failed projects in the 1960s led to revisions. Manyozo found that the school had been the most dynamic in testing and adopting new approaches and methodologies.

Institutions associated with the Bretton Woods school of development communication include: United Nations Educational, Scientific and Cultural Organization (UNESCO) Food and Agriculture Organization of the United Nations (FAO) Rockefeller Foundation Department for International Development, United Kingdom Ford Foundation

=== Latin America ===
The Latin American school of development communication predates the Bretton Woods school, emerging in the 1940s with the efforts of Colombia's Radio Sutatenza and Bolivia's Radios Mineras. They pioneered participatory and educational approaches to empowering the marginalised. In effect, they served as the earliest models for participatory broadcasting efforts around the world.

In the 1960s Paolo Freire's theories of critical pedagogy and Miguel Sabido's enter-educate method became important elements of the Latin American development communication school.

Other influential theorists include Juan Diaz Bordenave, Luis Ramiro Beltran, and Alfonso Gumucio Dagron (Manyozo 2006, Manyozo, 2005).

In the 1990s, technological advances facilitated social change and development: new media outlets emerged, cable TV reached more regions, and the growth of local communication firms paralleled the growth of major media corporations.

=== India ===
Organized development communication in India began with rural radio broadcasts in the 1940s. Broadcasts adopted indigenous languages to reach larger audiences.

Organized efforts in India started with community development projects in the 1950s. The government, guided by socialist ideals and politicians, started many development programs. Field publicity was employed for person-to-person communication. The radio played an important role in reaching the masses because literacy was low. Educational institutions – especially agricultural universities, through their extension networks – and international organizations under the United Nations umbrella experimented with development communication.

Non-governmental organizations (NGOs) relied on close inter-personal relations among communicators.

Communication from the government was more generic and unidirectional. So-called Public Information Campaigns were government-sponsored public fairs in remote areas that presented entertainment along with information on social and developmental schemes. Villagers engaged in competitions to attract attendees. Public and private organizations sponsored stalls in the main exhibition area. Development agencies and service/goods providers also attended. Some state governments employed this model.

Community radio was used in rural India. NGOs and educational institutions created local stations to broadcast information, advisories and messages on development. Local participation was encouraged. Community radio provided a platform for villagers to publicize local issues, offering the potential to elicit action from local officials.

The widespread adoption of mobile telephony in India created new channels for reaching the masses.

=== Africa ===
The African school of development communication sprang from the continent's post-colonial and communist movements in the late 1960s and early 1970s. Anglophone Africa employed radio and theatre for community education, adult literacy, health and agricultural education (Kamlongera, 1983, Mlama, 1971).

In 1994, the FAO project "Communication for Development in Southern Africa" was a pioneer in supporting and enhancing development projects and programs through the use of participatory communication. The FAO project, placed under SADC, developed an innovative methodology known as Participatory Rural Communication Appraisal (PRCA), which combined participatory tools and techniques with a strong communication focus needed to enhance projects results and sustainability. FAO and SADC published a handbook on PRCA that was used in projects around the world.

The radio maintained a strong presence in research and practice into the 21st century. Radio was especially important in rural areas, as the work of the non-governmental organization Farm Radio International and its members across sub-Saharan Africa demonstrated. Knowledge exchange between development partners such as agricultural scientists and farmers were mediated through rural radio (Hambly Odame, 2003).

=== Philippines ===
Systematic study and practice began at the University of the Philippines Los Baños in the 1970s, through the establishment of the Department of Development Communication in the College of Agriculture, which offered undergraduate and master's degrees.

Quebral coined the term "development communication" while at the university's Office of Extension and Publications, now the College of Development Communication (CDC). According to Felix Librero, the term was first used by Quebral in her 1971 paper, "Development Communication in the Agricultural Context," presented in at a symposium at the University of the Philippines Los Baños. In her paper, Quebral argued that development communication had become a science, requiring the tasks associated with communicating development-oriented issues be based on scientific inquiry. At the time the field was limited to agricultural and rural development.

At the time the term 'development support communication' was used in UNDP programmes under Erskine Childers, with coauthor and wife, Malicca Vajrathron. This area of research focused on the functions of communication in promoting UN agricultural and development programmes. Development communication at Los Baños became an academic field rather than a techniques program. Quebral cited Seers's definition of development in arguing for the term, as opposed to Childer's 'development support communication', which was used in public and in the scientific literature for the first time. Librero recounted that colleagues in agricultural communications in Los Baños agreed with Quebral, but colleagues from the field of mass communication in the University of the Philippines Diliman, and from countries in North America, did not initially agree, although they ultimately relented.

In 1993, in the Institute of Development Communication's faculty papers series, Alexander Flor proposed expanding the definition of development communication to include the perspective of cybernetics and general systems theory:

If information counters entropy and societal breakdown is a type of entropy, then there must be a specific type of information that counters societal entropy. The exchange of such information – be it at the individual, group, or societal level – is called development communication.

=== Participatory development communication ===
The evolution of the participatory development communication school involved collaboration between First World and Third World development communication organizations. It focused on community involvement in development efforts and was influenced by Freirean critical pedagogy and the Los Baños school (Besette, 2004).

=== World Bank ===
The World Bank actively promotes this field through its Development Communication division and published the Development Communication Sourcebook in 2008, a resource addressing the history, concepts and practical applications of this discipline.

Development Communication or Communication for Development

World Bank tends to espouse and promote the title "Development Communication" while UNICEF uses "Communication for Development". The difference seems to be a matter of semantics and not ideology since the end goals of these global organizations are almost identical to each other.

UNICEF explains:

Communication for Development (C4D) goes beyond providing information. It involves understanding people, their beliefs and values, the social and cultural norms that shape their lives. It includes engaging communities and listening to adults and children as they identify problems, propose solutions and act upon them. Communication for development is seen as a two-way process for sharing ideas and knowledge using a range of communication tools and approaches that empower individuals and communities to take actions to improve their lives.

World Bank defines Development Communication "as an interdisciplinary field, is based on empirical research that helps to build consensus while it facilitates the sharing of knowledge to achieve a positive change in the development initiative. It is not only about effective dissemination of information but also about using empirical research and two-way communications among stakeholders". (Development Communication division, the World Bank).

== Examples ==
One of the first examples of development communication was Farm Radio Forums in Canada. From 1941 to 1965 farmers met weekly to listen to radio programs, supplemented by printed materials and prepared questions to encourage discussion. At first, this was a response to the Great Depression and the need for increased food production in World War II. Later the Forums dealt with social and economic issues. This model of adult education or distance education was later adopted in India and Ghana. Radio DZLB was the community broadcasting station of UPLB College of Development Communication. It was a forerunner of the school-on-air (SOA) concept that provided informal education for farmers. DZLB hosted SOAs on nutrition, pest management and cooperatives. DZLB aired educational programming for farmers and cooperatives. Established in 2009, Global South Development Magazine has been a recent example of development communication in practice. Instructional television was used in El Salvador during the 1970s to improve primary education. One problem was a lack of trained teachers. Teaching materials were improved to make them more relevant. More children attended school and graduation rates increased. In the 1970s in Korea the Planned Parenthood Federation succeed in lowering birth rates and improving life in villages such as Oryu Li. It mainly used interpersonal communication in women's clubs. Oryu Li's success did not recur in all villages. The initial effort had the advantage of a remarkable local leader and visits from the provincial governor. A social marketing project in Bolivia in the 1980s tried to get women in the Cochabamba Valley to use soybeans in their cooking. This was an attempt to deal with chronic malnourishment among children. The project used cooking demonstrations, posters and broadcasts on local commercial radio stations. Some people tried soybeans but the outcome of the project was unclear. In 1999 the US and DC Comics planned to distribute 600,000 comic books to children affected by the Kosovo War. The books were in Albanian and featured Superman and Wonder Woman. The aim was to teach children what to do when they find an unexploded land mine left over from Kosovo's civil war. The comic books instruct children not to touch and not to move, but instead to call an adult for help. Since 2002, Journalists for Human Rights, a Canadian NGO, has operated projects in Ghana, Sierra Leone, Liberia, and the Democratic Republic of the Congo. JHR works directly with journalists, providing monthly workshops, student sessions, on the job training and additional programs on a country by country basis. Cuban Media and Education – In 1961, the year of education, the well known literacy campaign was initiated. Television and radio played a complementary role in the dissemination of literacy training programs. Live coverage of literacy worker and students was used to dramatise and this was reinforced on radio and in newspapers.

== Policy ==
Development communication policy covers formal and informal processes in which actors with different levels of power define, express and negotiate their interests in order to influence policy decisions. Alexander G. Flor argues that development communication and the policy sciences are distinct but inextricably linked disciplines. The policy sciences are the scientific study of policies and policy-making, while a policy is a set of decisions with specific objectives and a target audience.

UNESCO began studying national communication policies in the early 1970s and described them as sets of principles and norms established to guide the behaviour of communication systems. Van Cuilenburg and McQuail identify three phases of communications policy-making: an emerging communications industry phase until the Second World War, a public service media phase from 1945 to 1980, and, from 1980, a new paradigm shaped by technological convergence and globalization.

Flor identifies seven stakeholder sectors in communication policy: government, education, the communication industry, the private sector, the religious sector, foreign interests and consumers. Government is the most powerful, while consumers are traditionally the least consulted despite being the most affected. Hamelink and Nordenstreng have called for multistakeholder participation in information and communications technology governance, and Manyozo has criticized the lack of political economy analysis in communication policy debates, including the influence of funding institutions that reinforce cultural imperialism and unequal power relations.

Flor argues that both fields stem from the need to apply social science knowledge to large-scale societal problems under conditions of social change. Picard and Pickard have proposed principles for democratic media and communications policymaking, including meeting fundamental communication needs, promoting plurality, providing transparency and accountability, and pursuing equitable outcomes.

== International communication ==
International communication, the intellectual field that deals with issues of mass communication at a global level, is sometimes also called development communication. This field includes the history of the telegraph, submarine communication cables, shortwave or international broadcasting, satellite television, and global flows of mass media. Today it includes issues of the Internet in a global perspective and the use of new technologies such as mobile phones.

== Risk communication ==
Risk communication originated in the United States where environmental clean-up efforts were implemented through legislation. The terms 'risk communications' and 'risk management' were first used by William Ruckelshaus, the first administrator of the U.S. 'Environmental Protection Agency (EPA), which was established in the 1970s. Risk communication includes management decision risks, implementation risks and risks related to existing environmental, health, political, or social circumstances. For instance, in the health sector, risk communication addresses pandemics, natural disasters, bioterrorism, resource contamination, etc. Definitions of "risk" include: "The identification and analysis, either qualitative or quantitative, of the likelihood of the occurrence of a hazardous event overexposure, and the severity of injury or illness that may be caused by it." —American National Standard for Occupational Health and Safety Management Systems (ANSI/AIHA Z10 – 2005 ): "...the probability that a substance or situation will produce harm under specified conditions. Risk is a combination of two factors: (1) the probability that an adverse event will occur and (2) the consequences of the adverse event."—The Framework for Environmental Health Risk Management (Presidential/Congressional Commission on Risk Assessment and Risk Management, 1997): "...the probability (or likelihood) that a harmful consequence will occur as a result of an action."—The Safety Professionals Handbook (Fields 2008 ):

Risk management was described as: The evaluations and decisions that go into coping with risks (Lundgren and McMakin, 2004) Planning for a crisis, which should involve the removal of risks and allow an organization, a society, or a system adequate control(Fearn-Banks, 2007) and Factors that combat crises with the objective of minimizing damage. (Combs, 1999)

Risk communications involves important information for managing risks, both from authorities to those at risk and vice versa.

Development communication benefits from risk communications when the latter clarifies the risks of development (or lack thereof).

== Policy analysis in an organizational communication ==
Development in the community has been observed critically not only the stakeholders but also the public themselves. Being one the recipients of the community projects, the public has been eyeing the government on the implementation of the development projects they are implementing. Part of the analysis in the organization is by analyzing how the communication in an organization works. The two are related as discussed as follows:

=== Communication and its roles in development ===
In the Philippines, the Medium Term Development Plan for 2004–2010 of the National Economic Development Authority states, "the successful implementation of the plan rests on the support of all sectors of society—the legislature, the judiciary, the local government units, the media and all sectors of society" (NEDA, 2004).

In the context of Carnoy and Samoff (1990), they believed that education has great importance as part of the means of achieving social transformation. They emphasized that "appropriate ideas, values, and worldviews will be developed so that from the process of scholarship there emerges a new person—not simply with skills, but also someone with an understanding of his or her own role in the world".

More than analyzing how the process of the implementation will run through, it is also relative to note who will deliver the message pertaining to the development project. This is where the role of communication takes place. As mentioned by NEDA, media played an important role in the process of the delivery of development projects. With the wide range of power of media to influence and to transmit information, it has the capability to reach the public connecting to the government and vice versa.

Communication is pervasive in the process of development. Communication includes mass media, telecommunications, information and communication technologies (ICTs), organized interpersonal communication, and all resources used by a society to enable information to flow within it. It has for its aims to inform, educate, persuade, entertain, motivate people and induce behavior change that contributes toward national development.

According to Fraser and Restrepo-Estrada (2001): "Communication succeeds when it is an integral part, from the very beginning, of a development programme, playing a full role during the identification of the problems and priorities, as well as during the detailed planning, implementation, and evaluation... communication needs clear objectives, identification of different audience groups... careful message design... and monitoring and feedback."

=== Communication and organizational theory ===
As mentioned, delivery of development project can be achieved should proper communication will be used. In attaining such, an organization implementing the development project should consider the system to be used. An organization is where a system is being implemented. Its structure varied depending on the goals of the company, the image it portrays, and the quality it aims to achieve. Being a member of an organization, one has to know how the organization works.

This aim in knowing the technical-know-how within the organization leads to the concept of 'Organization Theory'. Later it becomes a 'social science discipline' which refers to "a body of thinking and writing that describes, explains and influences what goes on in organization". This leads to making this discipline as basis for exploring 'management and leadership theory' that enables the scholars to understand how an 'organization theory' works in the application of a certain system.

Further, organizational theory (OT), according to Barzilai (2016), is the "study of organizations for the benefit of identifying common themes for the purpose of solving problems, maximizing efficiency and productivity, and meeting the needs of stakeholders".

Thus, development communication interweaves with policy science and organizational theory for one reason: Development projects require an organization as deciding body in crafting policy leading to the attainment of the project and as implementor of the projects.

== Interface revisited and reinforced: development communication and policy sciences ==
To affirm the interface, I reviewed the notions of development communication and policy sciences. Development education, a related and a younger discipline is shortly discussed. I also highlight the similarities of these fields.

Quebral (2012) redefines development communication as "the science of human communication linked to the transition of communities from poverty in all its forms to a dynamic overall growth that fosters equity and the unfolding of individual potential" (p. 9).

Meanwhile, Guru (2016) explains that development communication "(1) provides a conceptual and practical framework in accelerating development in all spheres of life; (2) includes the integration of planned, organized, and specific communication package into planning, programming, and implementation; (3)facilitates the flow of development education among various stakeholders; and (4) empowers marginalized individuals, groups, and organizations" (p. 101).

I thought that development education is just a function or a subset of development communication just like information, motivation, persuasion, among others. In fact, it is discipline in its own right that started in the 1990s. Bourn (2015) describes it as "an education approach that (1) responds to issues of development, human rights, justice, and world citizenship; (2) presents an international development and human rights perspective within education in various parts of the world; (3) promotes voices and viewpoints of those who are excluded from an equal share in the benefits of international human development; (4) connects and compares development issues and challenges all over the world; (5) provides opportunities for people to reflect on their international roles and responsibilities with regard to issues of equality and justice in human development; and (6) narrates a new story of human development" (p. 47).

On the other hand, policy sciences or policy studies basically refer to the policy cycle, which involves "policy making, policy implementation, policy evaluation, and policy feedback" (Flynn and Asquer, 2017, p. 40). Originally, it is a function of governance and, therefore the domain of government officials. However, with democracy as a form of government in many nations, it has also become the domain of the governed, hence, the term public policy. Most available literature on policy studies quote the definition developed by Hence Thomas Dye as "whatever governments choose to do or not to do."

However, Chakrabarty and Chand (2016) argue that "[t]here cannot be a universal definition of policy although one can endure a near universal definition by highlighting its technical character" (p. 3). With these, they characterize Dye's definition as "functional in character" and contend that "governments are not at all free to choose because their choice is context-dependent and governed by the ideology they adhere to" (p. 4).

They raise the limitations Dye's definition: (1) does not reflect or represent the ideological goals of the government; (2) does not reflect the critical role of institutions; and (3) does not provide enough inputs to conceptualize public policy as an executive device and as a marker of ideology.

After presenting the etymology of "public" and "policy", they propose a layman's definition through an acronym: POLICY. PO stands for periodically organized, which suggests that policies are "constantly reinvented and transformed in accordance with changing social, economic, and political realities". To add, LI means legally induced, which suggests it cannot dispense "constitutions and other legal instruments in shaping policy." Lastly, CY means calculated yields, which implies that policies must be beneficial and profitable (p. 6).

With this, they propose a definition, that is, "[p]olicy being a functional design seeking to fulfill certain objectives on the basis of specific calculations of the pros and the cons, and this is naturally context-dependent" (p. 7). Hence, it has a dynamic character: (1) it considers the changing environment, and (2) it prioritizes public good.

They also enumerate the features of a policy: (1) intentional or deliberately designed to address societal issues; (2) a course of action with specific goals and objectives; (3) devised in response to a perceived need or demand or problem; (4)creates an environment in which various actors converge to develop policy designs; (5) an authoritative decision by the government (Chakbarty and Chand, 2016, p. 8).

Three broad and dynamic disciplines are presented. It is then instructive to highlight their commonalities or similarities to affirm their interface: (1) systematic (planned, organized, designed, or an approach); (2) change-oriented, preferably for the better if not the best (public good); (3) holistic and multidimensional; (4) pro-people or advocates of equity or social justice, and (5) largely participatory.

Development education, being the youngest field or discipline, has two distinct emphases: sustainable development and global citizenship (Bourn, 2015). A number of modifiers have come before the term development over time, but the most recent is sustainable, hence, the Sustainable Development Goals (SDGs). Guru (2016) defines it as "a vision of the future that provides necessary blueprint through which the developmental activities of individuals and institutions can be streamlined on the basis of ethical, humanitarian, and professional considerations" (p. 85). It has three dimensions: social, economic, and environmental (World Summit on Sustainable Development, 2002 in Guru, 2016). In fact, it is imperative for both development practitioners and policy makers to understand these dimensions.

== Culture ==
In the context of globalization, the need for communication is increasing. Many countries has invested in developing their technology which in turns speed up the exchange of information across different countries. This has led to a more complex work context in different institutions especially in business, education, and non-profit organizations. Employees not only has to deal with a lot of things that are not present in a very homogenous environment like observing other religious holidays, communicating in different languages, and also understanding different preferences on certain things. In a multi-cultural environment, organizational culture becomes more complex.

There were countless of research that show how poor communication can lead to poor organizational performance. It is important for every organisation to develop an effective means to communicate internally and externally in the organization and find ways to develop a health knowledge sharing culture. Understanding the impact of globalisation is crucial for any organisation to be competitive in the global market. In this context, effective communication is expected to create a healthy organizational culture by providing necessary information that will bridge many gaps in the organization.

Flor (2007) noted that "communication and culture are inextricably linked" (p. 112). Seemingly, communication constitutes culture and vice versa in any organizational engagement internally and externally. From time immemorial, effective internal organizational communication which reduces uncertainties and increases productivity in the workplace has been the common goal of many organizations worldwide. Consequently, effective communication processes could mean effective communication policies are in place explicitly or have been legitimized in practice. Making this complicated is perceived in how decision-makers, policy experts and organizational members interact in furthering organizational communication processes. Flor (2007) describes potential complexities at work that could burden more than could help the organization's communication culture.

The really difficult part of communication work (and perhaps the most time consuming) is pleasing everybody from your superior, to the subject matter specialist and, finally, to the user whose opinions (and tastes) may altogether vary from those of the decision-maker. This potentially is the most time consuming particularly since, right or wrong, everyone believes that he is a communication expert (p.167-168).

=== Participatory approach, community radio and policy development ===
The roots of participatory approaches in development communication according to Yoon (1996) can be found in the early years of the 1970s when many people in the development community began to question the top-down approach of development dominant in the 1950s and 60s which targeted the economic growth of countries as its main goal. Development according to Yoon (1996) was "thought to be triggered by the wide-scale diffusion and adoption of modern technologies". Such modernization Yoon (1996) further expounds, was planned in the national capitals under the guidance and direction of experts brought-in from developed countries. Often, the people in the villages who are the "objects" of these plans were the last to know when "strangers from the city turned-up, frequently unannounced, to survey land or look at project sites". However, the demarcation of the First, Second and Third Worlds by the late 1960s to early 1980s has broken down and the cross-over centre-periphery can be found in every region, a need for a new concept of development which emphasizes cultural identity and multidimensionality is raised (Servaes and Malikhao, 2005). Servaes and Malikhao (2005) posit that the'global' world, in general as well as in its distinct regional and national entities, is confronted with multifaceted crises. Apart from the obvious economic and financial crisis, they elaborate that one could also refer to social, ideological, moral, political, ethnic, ecological and security crises thus the previously held dependency perspective has become more difficult to support because of the growing interdependency of regions, nations and communities in the globalized world. A new viewpoint on development and social change has come to the forefront according to them which "the common starting point is the examination of the changes from 'bottom-up', from the self-development of the local community".

At first, speech, traditional and folk media, and group activities were considered the most appropriate instruments for supporting participatory communication hence, the practitioners in the mass media responded by innovating their own approach towards participatory communication (Yoon, 1996) which brought the emergence of community radios. The historical philosophy of community radio is to use this medium as the voice of the voiceless, the mouthpiece of the oppressed people and generally as a tool for development. Yoon (1996) articulates that in community radios, the people "produced and voiced the programs which were focused on local issues which were the most current and important making way for participatory communication to be practiced at both the community or village level and at the broader regional or sub-regional level". Most of the successes of community broadcasting are to be found in the non-formal education sector (Beltran, 1993 in Yoon, 1996). Literacy programs have been effectively conducted via community radio and television stations. Other subjects covered by these stations include gender issues, farming, health, income-generation, workers' safety and occupational health, land tenure, and religious matters (Yoon, 1996).

Mhagama (2015) posits that participatory development projects such as community radio employ a participatory approach to decision making processes and enable marginalized people to "define their own development path through the identification and implementation of projects that are initiated by them". He stresses that "participatory communication gives the local community a right to freely share or exchange information and to reach a consensus on what they want to do or to be done and how to do it". Tamminga (1997) in Mhagama (2015) addresses that in community radio the dichotomy between the rich and the marginalized sectors like women, indigenous peoples and the poor is broken by "allowing listeners an opportunity to shape the medium to meet their own specific needs and breakdown the monopolies of knowledge and power that marginalize them politically, economically and socially". In one project of UNESCO in partnership with the Danish International Development Agency (DANIDA), and the Philippine government a participatory communication project using community radio dubbed as "Tambuli" (Tambuli is a Filipino term referring to a traditional way of calling villagers to an important meeting)(Jayaweera and Tabing, 1997) was launched in 1991. According to Howley (2005) the project was able to make the community residents come to appreciate radio's potential as a forum to discuss issues of mutual concern allowing the local populations to give immediate and sustained feedback to local, regional and even national political leaders and authorities which afforded them greater opportunity to chart their own destiny.

Howley (2010) as cited in Mhagama (2015) stressed that "community radio highlights people's ability to alter and rearrange existing media structures to better suit their needs". This is made possible Servaes (1996) in Mhagama (2015) concludes because community radio allows non-professionals to participate in media production, management, and planning of the communication systems.

== Development communication and the policy sciences work together towards social change ==
Flor (n. d., as cited in Academia, 2015) states that policy sciences and development communication have seemingly identical underlying function in society: to solve societal issues and make social change possible for the benefit of the greater majority. Development communication and policy sciences share key characteristics. First, both policy sciences and development communication are purposive. They serve specific and systematic functions to achieve a common goal which is to solve issues and problems in society in order to achieve change. Second, both policy sciences and development communication believe that, at times, power and corrupt practices in the government have the potential to undermine reasoned logic. This is evident in the commercialisation of mass media that advances profit over social responsibility. Thus, development communication and policy sciences have the role to combat such corrupt practices. The third characteristic that policy sciences and development communication share is to heed action for policies to take effect. Policies that remain in print/word without action is a futile enterprise. A policy to be effective needs to be implemented, monitored, assessed and sustained. For development communication and policy sciences to make great impact to the world, participation or engagement of stakeholders is necessary. Below is an analysis of a few studies that deal with how development communication relates with policy sciences, and how they fuse in order to effect change in the larger society. In a discussion on the policy sciences, Allen (1978, as cited in Flor, n. d.) states:

Since communication permeates every facet of a person's behaviour, the study of communication is no less than one way to study policy making. Communication is a useful concept precisely because it is one more handle whereby we can effectively study policy making. Communication is one of those few variables through which any policy decision is dependent (p.69).

Another example where development communication takes an important role is in the global health space. International organizations such as the World Health Organization, the Gavi Vaccine Alliance, ASEAN, and the United Nations have all used the principles of development communication to achieve global impacts. Specifically, on 8 August 1967, the Association of Southeast Asian Nations (ASEAN), which was then composed of Indonesia, Malaysia, the Philippines, Singapore, and Thailand was established with the signing of the ASEAN Declaration (Bangkok Declaration). In the succeeding years, other Southeast Asian countries have joined, including Brunei (1984), Viet Nam (1995), Lao PDR (1997), Myanmar (1997), and Cambodia (1999) (ASEAN 2012a: 1). It was established to accelerate the economic growth, social progress, and cultural development in the region; promote regional peace and stability; promote active collaboration and mutual assistance on matters of common interest; provide assistance to each other in the form of training and research facilities; and collaborate more effectively for the greater utilization of their agriculture and industries; among others (ASEAN 2012a: 1). Criticisms on the ASEAN have, however, noted various failures in the regionalism efforts in Southeast Asia. Previous studies have defined regionalism as "more than an institutional process of multilateral policy coordination and the negotiation of competing stakeholder interests... [It is a] collective and intersubjective identities" (Elliott 2003: 29–52). Recent regionalism efforts worldwide also worked either institutionally or through cooperation among governments (Anonymous2005: 2291–2313). Although some argues that the ASEAN's regionalism efforts were seen as more of cooperation among the governments rather than an institutional one, development communication can play a key role in bridging these countries and towards commitment to the Declaration.

== Risk and disaster communication amongst the youths ==
The youths hold a pivotal role in making a difference in society. Being digital natives, they communicate efficiently, develop networks pervasively, and create, influence and change social norms and practices. In short, being communication natives who can create a collective voice, they have the power to influence policies and change perspectives deeply rooted in society. For instance, during disasters, the youths are viewed as passive victims with no role in communicating risks or preventing and responding to disasters. Since disaster management seems to be predominated by top-down strategies, not bottom-up, the youths are seen as weaklings who are at the receiving end of calamity relief operations. However, Mitchell, Haynes, Hall, Wei and Oven (2008) seem to have refuted this perception based on the findings of their case studies in El Salvador and New Orleans. Mitchell et al. (2008) concluded that children and youths can be potential informants within informal and formal risk communication networks. Their case studies have shown that:

children and youth can become effective conduits, vehicles and bridges as they are embedded within the household and community and can act as trusted two-way "translators" and communicators. Overall, children and youth were found to be effective communicators of risk when language barriers exist increasing the agency of young people, an outside agent has helped support the organization of youth groups, the community has strong social cohesion, and there is a level of distrust in political sources (such as police impunity) (p. 269).

In the Philippines, a study by Fernandez and Shaw (2013) found that even until today, "young people are not given an active role in (or worse, are excluded from) the action toward disaster risk reduction" (p. 135). Fernandez and Shaw's (2013) review of national policies of the Philippines related to youth council participation in disaster risk reduction (DRR) shows discrepancies between ideal scenarios and actual youth participation in DRR in practice. So much more needs to be done in engaging young people in helping build disaster resilient communities. However, although these discrepancies exist, there are many success stories of Filipino youths involved in development programs with the aim to prepare communities for disasters. The National Youth Commission (NYC, 2013) believed that children and youth are not just a vulnerable group, but can play vital roles in their communities to prepare for future disasters. For instance, the Tanay Mountaineers Youth Arm, a Ten Accomplished Youth Organization (TAYO) 2013 winner, has been responding to victims of disasters not only in Tanay, Rizal but even in Quezon Province since Typhoon Ondoy (Ketsana) hit their town in 2009 (Rappler.com, 2014). The local government of Tanay has tapped the Tanay Mountaineers as the official disaster response team of the municipality. Another TAYO 2013 winner, the Hayag Youth Organization, carried out the "Langoy para sa Kaluwasan," a Swim Camp Disaster Preparedness and Open Water Safety Training for children and youth from impoverished communities in Ormoc City, Leyte. This is in response to the fact that many youths in Ormoc still do not know how to swim apart from the fact that water safety skills are not taught to them in school (Rappler.com, 2014). Despite scepticism, there still exists a growing optimism that policy scientists and communication policy developers can help review and reaffirm existing youth policies in the Philippines in engaging youth groups themselves for DRR projects, among others. Fernandez and Shaw (2013) posited that open and engaging communication is necessary so that the youths become more involved in disaster management and risk reduction efforts in their communities.

== Urban farming in cities and countries ==
Globalisation has been shaping this world into a small village. With this phenomenon comes urbanisation or massive urban planning that governments and private industries are advancing. With policies being created and governance being mandated, remote heartlands of countries are now slowly being transformed into urbanised places and spaces which in turn produce setbacks such as pollution, health issues and other social problems. However, one trend that is becoming popular in some countries is urban forestry which somehow demands for sound scientific information and public participation. According to Janse and Konijnendijk (2007), urban society's manifold perceptions, preferences and demands for urban forest goods and services indicate the necessity for socially inclusive policy planning processes. They said that successful policies can only be formulated by establishing close links with, for example, urban planning and municipal policies. Inherently, this means that close ties between research and policy are required. They discussed the outcomes of the NeighbourWoods research and development project in which a wide range of tools for public participation were tested in six urban woodland case-studies across Europe. Findings confirmed that a set of tools comprising a step-wise process from informing the public in an attractive way, collecting information on public opinion, towards fully participatory approaches such as direct involvement in decision-making is most likely to ensure socially inclusive planning. Communication with policy-makers requires a high degree of openness, clearly explaining every phase of the process, being open about each other's expectations, and developing relationships based on mutual trust (Janse & Konijnendijk, 2007).

Despite power issues that lurk in most organisations and governments, Development Communication and policy sciences seem to advance specific and systematic functions to achieve a common goal for the benefit of the majority. This is shown in an increasingly global India, whereby an agricultural community in Pune, Maharashtra was faced with losing farmland to urbanisation and devised an unusual solution (Sami, 2013). Pooling their land together, the farmers in this community leveraged their social and political networks to take advantage of the changing economic climate in Pune and built a mixed-use township on their 400 acres of farmland (Sami, 2013). They formed alliances with other stakeholders, both internally within the agricultural community and externally at the city and state levels. Sami (2013) concluded that "ad-hoc coalitions in the power and politics of urban processes in an Indian city have emerged as a result of a political will and leadership vacuum in Indian cities in the face of the changing focus and priorities of national and regional governments as well as a growing gap in urban service provision" (p. 151).

== Communication for development (C4D) and e-Agriculture ==
If highly urbanised and wealthy cities or countries are advancing urban agriculture, it cannot be denied that many of the Third World countries are also at par when it comes to improving agricultural processes and policies and in the informatisation of agriculture. In Malawi, one of the poorest regions in Africa, Agunga (2012) emphasised that the success rate of poverty-reduction programming could be greater if C4D education was provided for development decision-makers and field staff, especially agricultural extension workers. Agunga (2012) further stated that agricultural extension education can impact development by focusing on how C4D can strengthen agricultural extension performance. He implied that educating policymakers about C4D will increase donor investments in pilot C4D projects, a strengthening of agricultural extension systems, and success of poverty-reduction programs (Agunga, 2012).

In the Philippines, a book by Flor (2007) entitled Development Communication Praxis discussed a rice scandal such that in the last quarter of 1990, the Philippines groaned as the price of rice and other commodities went up. Flor (2007) said:

Rice farmers who were expected to gain from the situation were likewise disadvantaged. They were not able to sell their produce at reasonable prices. On one hand, their bumper crop entailed expensive inputs – certified high yielding varieties, irrigation, pesticides and fertilizer. On the other, middle men bought their harvest at cutthroat prices leaving them penniless and in debt... the nature of the rice industry is such that information, particularly market information, means money and power. For all practical purposes, the Philippine rice industry is controlled by a group of obscure Filipino-Chinese businessmen called the Binondo Rice Cartel... Employing a nationwide marketing network composed mainly of fellow Filipino-Chinese traders, the cartel has held a viselike grip over rice trading since the post World War II years that enable them to virtually dictate the buying price of dried paddy all over the country (pp. 114–115).

What was done when this happened? Did development communication come into the picture? Was change sought? There were a few discussions on alternatives such as proper use of funds since it was observed that international donations for the agricultural farmers were spent more on the informatisation of agriculture (increasing need for computers, logistical aids, etc.) instead of investing into more practical and realistic methods to empower the farmers and improve their farming methods. Attention was also given to the rise of white-collar jobs which was cutting down the numbers of agricultural farmers tilling the land (Flor, 2007). The youths became more attracted to the life in the city and to seek for office or desk jobs than remain in the province and till the farm. With this, Flor (2007) suggested policy rationalisation:

Rationalisation need not mean a reduction of monies awarded to the information sector. It primarily means the rearrangement of priorities and the increase of allotment to actual farming activities in the case of agriculture or to direct social services in the case of rural development. (p. 123).

However, with the seemingly hegemonic influence of the internet and the impact of globalisation, the field of agriculture needs to adapt to radical changes in society for it to become sustainable. As policy sciences and development communication suggest, the goal of communication and policies is to empower individuals or groups, and this empowerment necessitates crucial adaptation to an ever-changing world. This brought agriculture into another layer: e-agriculture. What is e-agriculture? The Food and Agriculture Organisation (FAO, 2013) defined this as: <block quote>An emerging field focusing on the enhancement of agricultural and rural development through improved information and communication processes. More specifically, e-Agriculture involves the conceptualization, design, development, evaluation and application of innovative ways to use information and communication technologies (ICT) in the rural domain, with a primary focus on agriculture (p. 1).

In a post on e-Agriculture webpage, Walter (2009), indicates that the Philippines has launched a Knowledge Working Towards Enhancing Agricultural Communities Program or K-Agrinet project with the aim to promoting the use of ICT to attain agricultural sustainability and competitiveness for the country's farmers. The project is a collaborative effort amongst the country's diverse agencies to utilize information technology (IT) as a tool to fast-track the dissemination of agriculture and natural resources information and technologies to farmers, upland dwellers, and rural entrepreneurs in the Philippines. The institutional key players in the agricultural and natural resource sectors are: (1) the e-Learning led by the Open Academy for Philippine Agriculture of the Department of Agriculture-Philippine Rice Research Institute (DA-PhilRice) which focuses on e-extension and distance learning for agriculture extension workers; (2) the e-Consortia led by the Department of Science and Technology-Philippine Council for Agriculture, Forestry and Natural Resources Research and Development (DOST-PCARRD) which intensifies technology and knowledge generation and exchange amongst existing partner R&D Institutions through improved ICT tools and applications; (3) the e-Farm also led by DOST-PCARRD that promotes e-commerce by initiating e- based farm to market opportunities through the FITS centers and their respective farmer-scientists; and lastly, (4) the e-Agrikultura led by the Department of Agrarian Reform (DAR) and Development Academy of the Philippines (DAP) tasked at mobilising and generating the participation of agrarian reform communities into the program (Walter, 2009, p. 1).

Indeed, the goal of C4D and e-agriculture is clear: to improve the lives of people especially the poor and the marginalised. This entails educating and empowering them for the impact of change to be sustainable.

== Women's roles on development through advancing policies ==
Reports and studies show that women are mostly victims of many kinds of abuse. For instance, Kaunda (1990) described that a smallholder development strategy in Malawi, Africa puts emphasis on commercialization of agriculture, combined with decision making processes which are centralized in the bureaucracy, serving only to reproduce and perpetuate historical forms of social differentiation which are the basis of the women's subordination and/or subjugation.

However, it can be seen in the past few decades that women have been successful in championing a cause and in letting their voices be heard in the society. Women from all walks of life have been engaging themselves into some development projects. For Instance, in the Philippines, the World Food Programme (WFP, 2012) launched a project in the Philippine island of Mindanao to helping women kick start agriculture in the region by providing them with the training they need to become successful farmers. This shows that women can be empowered and independent – two qualities that development communication and policy sciences are championing. HumanaPeopletoPeople (2012) is also promoting gender equality in India, whereby, to release the empowerment of women, the women in their communities have formed coalitions such as women self-help groups focusing on community projects. The women are empowered to bargain, to have economic influence, to earn money for improvement of health and education of the family and to gain a stronger social standing.

Either in the First World or in the Third World nations, a huge number of women are making a difference in a lot of fields with the goal to contribute to character and nation-building. In the field of developing women's capacities to run and manage their small-medium enterprises (SMEs), Gail Romero, the founder and CEO for Collective Changes, has been providing effective technology platforms to business mentors for women's SMEs in developing nations.

Gail continues to drive support for empowering women in business and global recognition of the economic engine that women can provide to their nations. Gail is also Senior Advisor for MacKenzie-Romero Consulting, Executive Producer for Rainmakers TV and carried the title of Ambassador for Global Health for the American Cancer Society until August 2011. Gail has spent the last two decades creating and directing the development and integration of innovative economic ideas and campaigns and strategic alliances with policy makers to advance women in leadership throughout the world... She has held numerous corporate board positions for start-up companies and guided new social venture partnerships. She has served as a visiting professor and international speaker and presenter on social justice, women's issues and education. Gail is a recent TED Prize nominee for her work to leverage technology to grow women's business skills ("Advancing Women in Leadership", 2014).

Development communication and policy sciences have gone a long way to advancing the rights and freedom of people – children and youths, women, farmers, labourers, etc., with the goal that they become more informed and empowered to make decisions for themselves and their communities, to realise their full potential and to become a catalyst for change as Flor (2007) postulated.

== Agenda setting ==
Agenda setting is an important topic in the Development Communication and policy sciences because it sets problems and issues into policies. It sets the tone of how policies are crafted, based on the needs of the public. Equally important in this discussion is understanding the Agenda Setting Process by which problems and alternative solutions gain or lose public and elite attention (Birkland, 2011). It is in this area where individuals take collective action and vie for attention. According to Schattschneider (1960), groups that successfully describe a problem will also be the one to define the solutions to it, thereby prevailing in public debate.

Another idea offered by Schattschneider is the Theory of Group Mobilization & Participation in Agenda Setting wherein the issues are more likely to be elevated to agenda status if the scope of conflict is broadened. There are 2 ways to broaden an issue:

1. Groups go public by using symbols and images or;
2. Groups to lose the first level of public interest appeal to a higher decision-making level.

When powerful groups lose control of the agenda, they are said to enter into policy debates to gain attention (Baumgartner & Jones), while other groups do venue shopping and ally with those who are able to advance their issues.

Levels of Agenda

From the vast field of issues (Agenda Universe), groups push issues meriting public attention "within the legitimate jurisdiction of existing governmental authority" (Birkland, quoting Cobb and Elder), moving to the next level (Systemic Agenda). Ideas that gain active and serious consideration of decision/policy makers go the next level (Institutional Agenda). If acted upon, it reaches Decision Agenda—the last level in the policy making process. Within these levels there are push and pull actions that happen between and among interest groups in order to pursue or challenge such initiatives.

Process of Policy Development (also Stages of the Policy Cycle)

It includes the following activities that sets off creation of policies:

1. Issue Framing – which is a technique of getting the issues on the policy maker's agenda so that a problem is recognized and debated.
2. Agenda setting as already discussed in previous paragraphs.
3. Policy Formulation wherein proposed actions are articulated, debated and drafter into language.
4. Advocacy & policy dialogue which will involve and mobilize stakeholders and the public, and
5. Data analysis which focuses on political costs and benefits.

== See also ==
- Global South Development Magazine
- Global digital divide
- New World Information and Communication Order
- World Summit on the Information Society
