= Philam Life Theater =

Defunct performing arts venue in Manila, Philippines

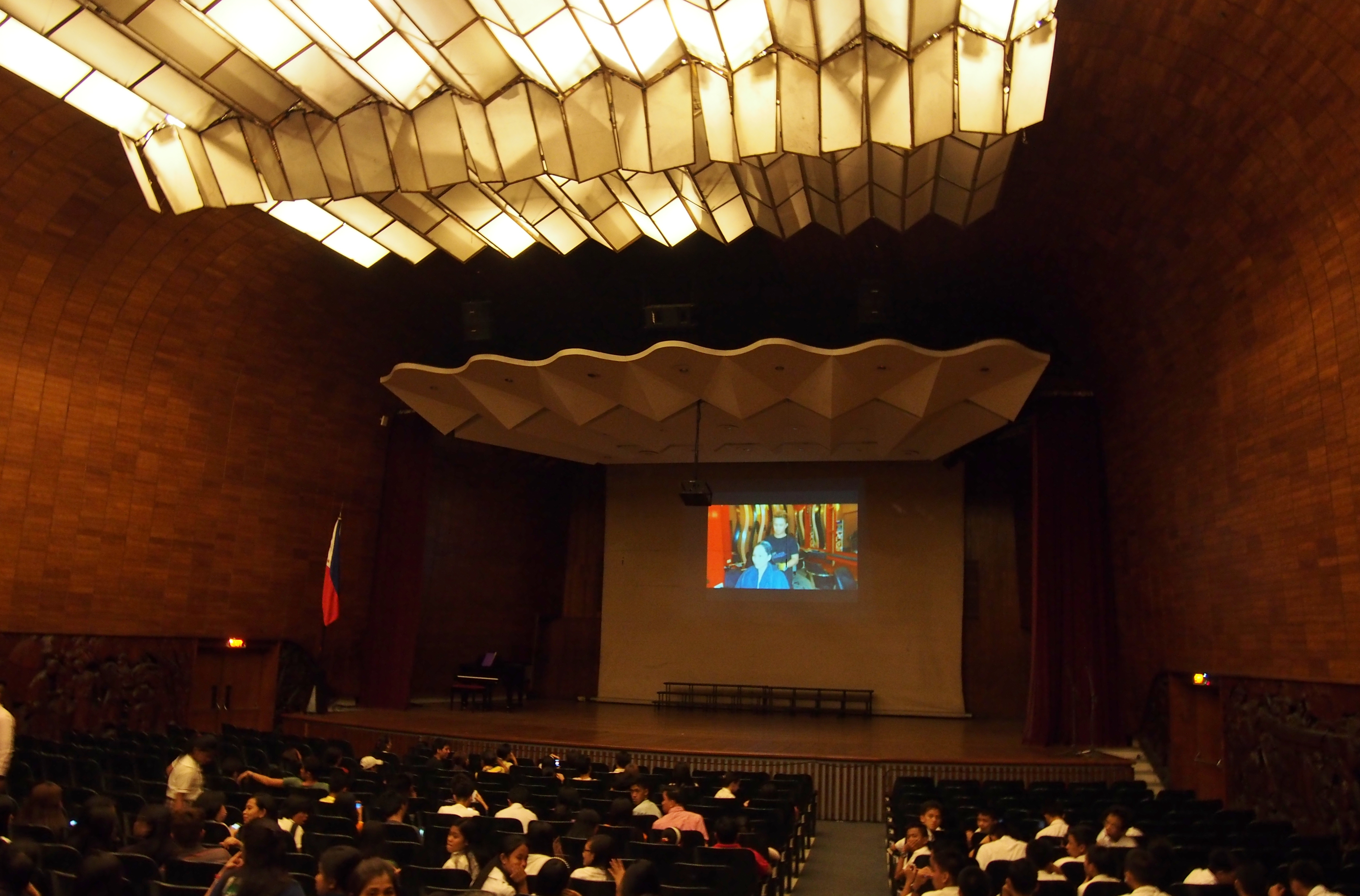
- Interactive map of Philam Life Theater
- Former names: Philam Life Auditorium
- Location: 1440 United Nations Avenue, Ermita, Manila, Metro Manila, Philippines; 1000
- Coordinates: 14°34′50″N 120°58′58″E
- Owner: Philam Life (1961–2012); SM Investments (2012–2020)
- Capacity: 780
- Public transit: United Nations

Construction
- Opened: 1961
- Closed: April 1, 2013
- Demolished: 2020
- Architect: Carlos Arguelles

The Philam Life Theater, also styled Philamlife Theater, was a performing arts venue at 1440 United Nations Avenue in the Ermita district of Manila, the Philippines. It opened in 1961 as the Philam Life Auditorium and was designed by Filipino architect Carlos Arguelles as part of the corporate headquarters for the Philam Life insurance company (now AIA Philippines). The International Style concert hall in the eastern annex of the Philam Life Building is known for its superior acoustics and elegant interior.

The building including the theater was acquired by SM Development Corporation (SMDC) in September 2012. A petition was launched the following year to preserve the theater, with SMDC pledging to preserve the venue. The Philam Life Theater closed in March 2013. Nevertheless the building was later demolished in 2020.

== History ==
The Philam Life Building which hosted the Philam Life Theater was built in 1961. The International Style building was designed by architect Carlos Arguelles was intended to be the corporate headquarters of insurance firm, Philam Life (now AIA Philippines).

SM Development Corporation (SMDC) acquired the property in September 2012 from Philam Life through a bidding process. In January 2013, French conductor Olivier Ochanine of the Philippine Philharmonic Orchestra launched a petition urging the owners to preserve the theater inside the building. SMDC publicly confirmed the acquisition in March 2013 and plans to redevelop the site to a condominium with a theater.

The last performance at the Philam Life Theater was held in March 13, 2013; Elegantly Brahms a classical music concert with Sofya Gulyak and the Philippine Philharmonic Orchestra.

In April 2013, the petition by Ochanine reached 10,000 signatures. SMDC also promised to preserve the theater including the acoustics following a dialogue between SMDC CEO Henry Sy, Jr. and Ochanine. SMDC stated that the hall may be moved within the complex as part of its plan for the property.

By August 2020, the Philam Life Building itself was already being demolished.

== Facility ==
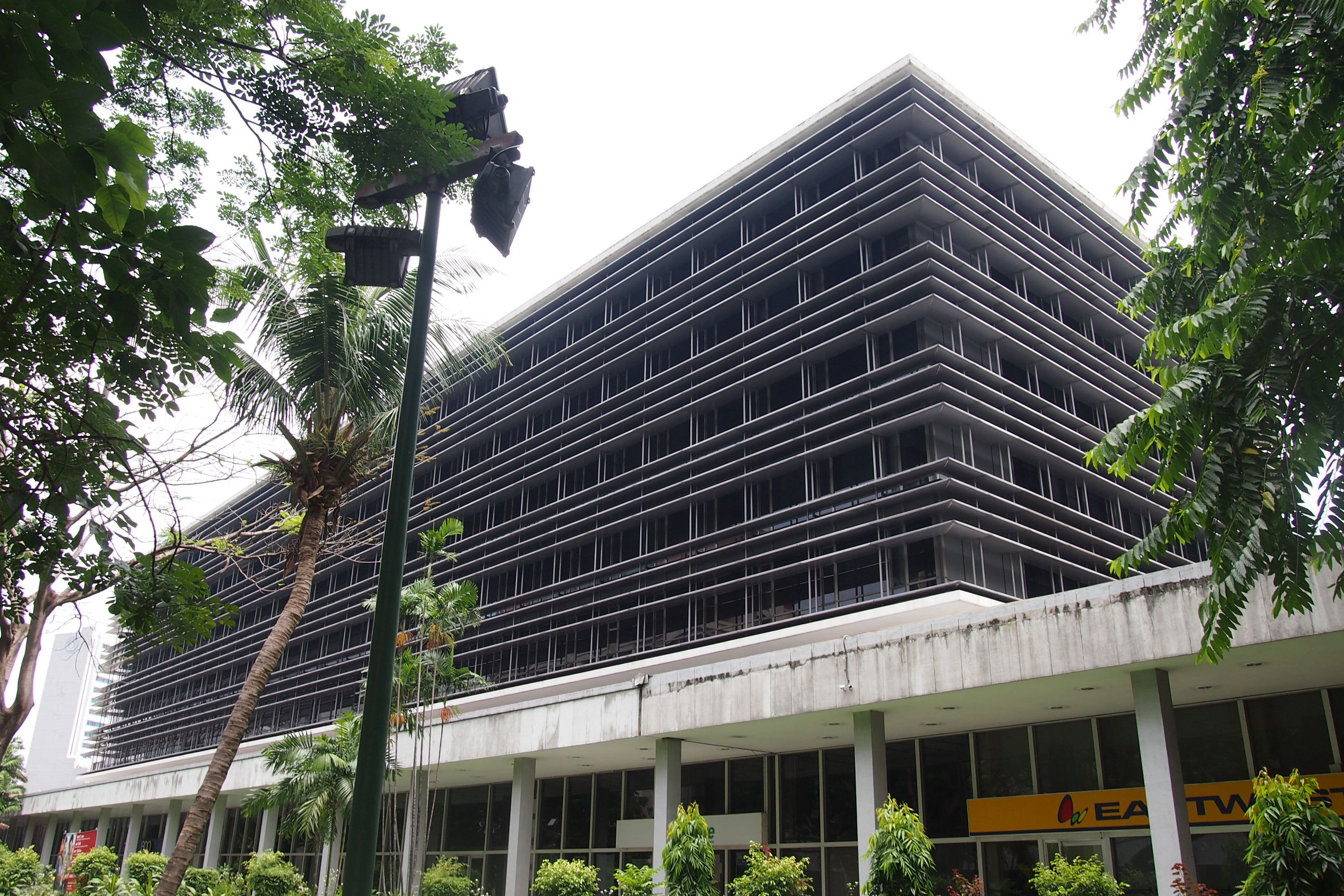
The façade of the Philam Life Building on United Nations Avenue in 2012, just less than a year before its closure

The Philam Life Theater is a proscenium theatre with a seating capacity of 780. It has a rectangular floor area in front of the stage with curved walls and a large concealed cavity above the ceiling where elegant glass light panels hang. Its walls were adorned by narra relief carvings which encompassed the entire length of the theater's orchestra. The 1,536-meter (5,039 ft) multi-panel carved narra murals depicting Philippine folklore, traditional musical instruments, and mythical characters like Maria Makiling and Malakas at Maganda was designed by Filipino sculptor José Alcántara in 1961 and created with the help of local artists from Paete, Laguna. They are now housed at the National Museum of Fine Arts following the closure of the Philam Life complex for redevelopment.

Narra wood bricks embellish the walls above the murals and a cementitious panel form the stage's ceiling. The theater's acoustic design was carried out by BBN Technologies (Bolt, Beranek and Newman) who also created the acoustics for the United Nations General Assembly Hall in New York City, Lincoln Center’s David Geffen Hall and the Joseph Meyerhoff Symphony Hall in Baltimore.

== Tenants ==
The Philam Life Theater had the Manila Symphony Orchestra and the Manila Philharmonic Orchestra as its tenants.
