= DYUP =

DYUP is a call sign assigned to two radio stations owned by the University of the Philippines Visayas in Iloilo, Philippines:

- DYUP-AM, an AM radio station broadcasting in Iloilo City
- DYUP-FM, an FM radio station broadcasting in Iloilo City
