= DZLB =

DZLB is a call sign assigned to two radio stations owned by the University of the Philippines Los Baños in the Philippines

- DZLB-AM, an AM radio station broadcasting in Los Baños, Laguna.
- DZLB-FM, an FM radio station broadcasting in Los Baños, Laguna.
