= DZUP =

Radio station in Metro Manila, Philippines

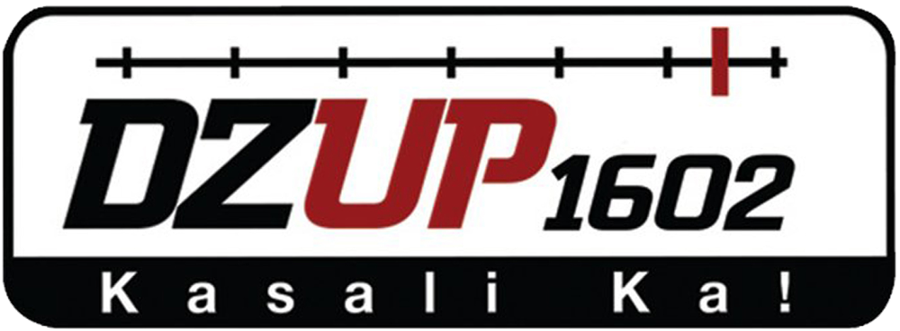
- Quezon City; Philippines
- Broadcast area: Metro Manila and surrounding areas
- Frequency: 1602 kHz
- Branding: DZUP 1602

Programming
- Languages: Filipino, English
- Format: College Radio

Ownership
- Owner: University of the Philippines Diliman

History
- First air date: 1958
- Former frequencies: 1580 kHz (1958–1972); 1566 kHz (1987–1994)
- Call sign meaning: University of the Philippines

Technical information
- Licensing authority: NTC
- Power: 5,000 watts

Links
- Webcast: Listen Live
- Website: www.dzup.org

DZUP (1602 AM) is a campus radio station owned and operated by the University of the Philippines Diliman. Its studio facility is located at the 2nd floor, Media Center of the College of Mass Communication, U.P. Diliman campus, in Quezon City; while its transmitter is located at Village B corner Delos Reyes St., UP Village, Diliman, Quezon City.

The station is being used as a laboratory for the Broadcast Communication students of the university, with programming that includes music programs and request shows to informative segments and talk shows. It serves as the community radio station of the U.P. Diliman campus, which has also become the bastion of freedom of expression and academic freedom within the university.

== Awards and recognitions ==
Over the recent years, DZUP has been nominated for Best AM Station for four (4) non-consecutive years at the KBP Golden Dove Awards. Aside from the station, most of its programs, special promotional materials and public service announcements were recognized by the KBP, the Catholic Mass Media Awards (CMMA), and other award-giving organizations.

== Stations owned by other UP campuses ==
Callsign	Frequency	Campus (Location)
DZLB-AM	1116 kHz	UP Los Baños (Los Baños)
DZLB-FM	97.4 MHz	UP Los Baños (Los Baños)
DYUP-AM	873 kHz	UP Visayas (Iloilo)
DYUP-FM	102.7 MHz	UP Visayas (Iloilo)

== See also ==
- Radyo Katipunan
- DLSU Green Giant FM
- UST Tiger Radio
- University of the Philippines Diliman
