= Devcom =

Devcom or DEVCOM may refer to:

- The College of Development Communication of the University of the Philippines Los Baños
- The United States Army Combat Capabilities Development Command
