= GSDM =

GSDM may refer to:

- Global South Development Magazine, a political magazine
- GSD&M, an American advertising agency
- Graduate School of Defense Management, the Naval Postgraduate School's business school operated by the United States Navy

== See also ==
- All pages with titles containing GSDM
