= Nora C. Quebral =

Filipino development communication scholar

- Born: September 5, 1926; Manila, Philippine Islands
- Died: October 24, 2020 (aged 94); Quezon City, Philippines
- Education: University of the Philippines Diliman (BA); University of Wisconsin–Madison (MS); University of Illinois at Urbana–Champaign (PhD)
- Known for: pioneering the discipline of Development Communication in Asia; Development Communication in the Agricultural Context
- Relatives: Flerida Ruth Pineda-Romero (cousin)
- Awards: Hildegard Award for Women in Media and Communication in 2007.
- Scientific career
- Fields: Development Communication
- Workplaces: University of the Philippines Los Baños College of Development Communication

Nora Cruz Quebral was a pioneer in the discipline of development communication in Asia and is often referred to as the "mother of development communication", giving birth to an academic discipline and training many scholars in that field. Among her students were internationally known devcom educators and practitioners such as Felix Librero, Pedro Bueno, Antonio Moran, Alexander Flor, Rex Navaro and Maria Celeste Cadiz. Her landmark 1971 paper entitled Development Communication in the Agricultural Context and her leadership of what was then the UP College of Agriculture's Department of Agricultural Communication, paved the way for academic programs in development communication at the University of the Philippines Los Baños (UPLB). That institution later became the UPLB College of Development Communication (CDC), where Quebral served as Professor Emeritus.

In three separate terms spanning 17 years, from 1966 to 1985, Quebral served as the chairperson of the various earlier incarnations of what later became the CDC, where her colleagues referred to her by her initials, "NCQ".

She also served as a consultant and founded the Nora C. Quebral Development Communication Centre, Inc., which conducts development communication projects in health, the environment, and agriculture.

She received the first Hildegard Award for Women in Media and Communication in 2007.

== Educational background ==
Quebral graduated magna cum laude with a BA in English from the University of the Philippines Diliman in 1950. She then earned her MS in agricultural journalism at the University of Wisconsin–Madison as US International Cooperation Agency and Philippine National Economic Council scholar in 1956-57, and then received her PhD in communication at the University of Illinois at Urbana–Champaign as Rockefeller Foundation scholar in 1963-66.

== Early career ==
While a student, Quebral worked as secretary at the Claims Service of the US Army. When she graduated in 1950, she served as a debate stenographer of the Labor Management Advisory Board.

In 1952, she became a copy editor of the journal Philippine Agriculturist, starting her career in what was then the University of the Philippines College of Agriculture (UPCA), now the University of the Philippines Los Baños.

In October 1954 UPCA, then 45 years old, instituted the Office of Extension and Publications (UPCA-OEP) with Quebral was one of its three Filipino staff members, adding an extension component to its mission, in addition to instruction and research. This office became an academic department in 1960, founding Quebral's career as a faculty member.

== Pioneering the field of development communication ==
In 1971, she delivered her paper Development Communication in the Agricultural Context at a UPCA symposium in honor of its outgoing dean, Dioscoro L. Umali. Drawing from the works of Alan Chalkley, Wilbur Schramm, and Daniel Lerner, among others, she coined a definition of the field outlining its basic theory and practice.

In that paper she noted that:

The reason for my having to coin my own definition is that development communication is still very much in the evolutionary stage so that no one is quite prepared to be pinned down to an exact definition of it.

The UP College of Agriculture was declared an autonomous unit of the University of the Philippines system the following year, 1972, and was reborn as the University of the Philippines Los Baños (UPLB).

Quebral's department was renamed the Department of Development Communication the following year, 1973, and opened the Master of Science in development communication program — the Philippines' first academic degree program in Communication. The next year, UPLB's university council approved the bachelor's program in development communication.

When the PhD program in development communication received approval in 1976, the DDC became the first in the world to offer degree courses in development communication at the undergraduate, masters, and doctorate levels.

She also founded a development communication program in Xavier University - Ateneo de Cagayan in the late 60's.

== Development communication ==
The former dean of the UPLB College of Development Communication, noted that:

The history of the UPLB College of Development Communication is in a large part the history of Nora’s career in the academe, along with that of the development communication program and its practice at Los Baños.

— Dr. Maria Celeste H. Cadiz

Quebral has, time and again, redefined development communication over the years, rethinking its basic tenets and reorienting her definition to fit the evolving challenge of development. These revisions to her definition of the field have served as guides towards new directions for the numerous scholars and practitioners of the field.

While she first gave a definition for the development communication in 1971, her latest revision, presented in 2001, delineates the field as:

the art and science of human communication linked to a society's planned transformation from a state of poverty to one of dynamic socio-economic growth that makes for greater equity and the larger unfolding of individual potential.

== Retirement ==
The DDC was elevated into the Institute of Development Communication in 1987, and Quebral took an early retirement the following year, after 28 years in the academe. She set up the Nora C. Quebral Development Communication Center, Inc. (NCQDCCI) and focused on professional practice and research.

She was later named Professor Emeritus at UPLB CDC, where she consulted with experts and scholars in development communication. She was awarded an LSE honorary doctorate in 2011. In 2013, she was given the UP Alumni Association’s Lifetime Distinguished Achievement Award.

== See also ==
- Development communication
