= Green Giant FM =

DLSU Radio-Green Giant FM
Manila; Philippines
- Broadcast area: Worldwide (via internet)
- Branding: DLSU Radio-Green Giant FM

Programming
- Format: College radio, Indie, OPM, Contemporary hit radio

Ownership
- Owner: De La Salle University

History
- First air date: 2008

Links
- Webcast: Listen Live
- Website: greengiantfm.com

DLSU Radio-Green Giant FM (also known as GGFM) is an internet campus radio station owned by the De La Salle University, with management handled by the Student Media Office. The station's studio is located at Br. Bloemen Hall in the university's Taft Avenue campus in Manila. Green Giant FM is currently streaming online with live shows every weekdays (except during semester breaks), and automated music during off-peak hours.

Despite being an internet station, it also serves as a community radio station of DLSU and of the Lasallian campus.

== History ==
In 2008, a group of Lasallian students under the organizations Team Communications (TeamComm) and Electronics and Communications Engineering Society (ECES) created a collaborative effort to form a new station of DLSU, under the name Green Giant FM. It began its broadcast during the beginning of the new academic year 2008–2009.

On May 25, 2018, the station celebrated its 10th anniversary at the Bro. Andrew Gonzales Hall in DLSU. The event was gathered by performances from live bands and other personalities, who were also previously part of the organization.

== See also ==
- DZUP 1602
- Radyo Katipunan 87.9
- UST Tiger Radio
