= Jesuit Communications Foundation =

- Type: Film production
- Founded: 1995
- Headquarters: Quezon City, Philippines
- Key people: Fr. Emmanuel Alfonso
- Owner: Society of Jesus

Jesuit Communications Foundation (JesCom) is the media arm of the Philippine Province of the Society of Jesus. JesCom was founded in 1995 by the late Rev. Fr. James B. Reuter, S.J. and is based in the Ateneo de Manila University in Quezon City. JesCom is involved in the production of audiovisual materials for evangelization and education.

== See also ==
- Jesuit Music Ministry
- List of Jesuit educational institutions in the Philippines
- Radyo Katipunan
