= Bureau of Applied Social Research =

US research institute

The Bureau of Applied Social Research was a social research institute at Columbia University which specialised in mass communications research. It grew out of the Radio Research Project at Princeton University, beginning in 1937. The Bureau's first director was Austrian sociologist Paul Lazarsfeld. The project took on permanent form as the Office of Radio Research, moving to Columbia in 1939. It was renamed the 'Bureau of Applied Social Research' in 1944.

The bureau was closed in 1977, when its archives were merged into Columbia's Center for the Social Sciences which in turn became part of the Institute for Social and Economic Theory and Research in 1999, which in turn became part of the Institute for Social and Economic Research and Policy in 2001.

== Criticism ==
Daniel Lerner's involvement in the Bureau of Applied Social Research was the subject of criticism regarding his work in The Passing of Traditional Society was alleged to have violated certain ethical considerations while conducting research for the book. The research was conducted as a field survey in Turkey, Greece, Germany, Lebanon, Israel, Syria, Egypt, Iraq, Iran & Jordan, with special focus on Turkey. In all, 1600 interviews were used for the book. Samarajiva writes that even though the original purpose of research had been said to be about empathy and media participation, many of the questions in the survey had to do with foreign radio broadcast and sentiments regarding US, UK and USSR. The questionnaire consisted of 9 questions about movies, 17 about newspapers and 49 about radio. Of the 49 questions about radio, 23 were about foreign broadcasting. In fact, Samarajiva writes that,

"A restricted document from the Program Evaluation Branch, International Broadcasting Division, Department of State, titled 'Projected Research Plans' and issued prior to the actual research, lists the questions, Voice of America was interested in having asked. These questions had corresponding questions in the BASR project as well."

He, therefore, argues that BASR research formed the basis to find target audiences for Voice of America. According to the ethics of research as outlined by Ithiel de Sola Pool, the research project did not adequately concern itself with ethics of research. The researchers did not:

- fully disclose the sponsors of the research in their host countries,
- fully reveal to the native researchers the purposes of the research,
- adequately publish the results of the research in the host countries,
- ensure the safety of the researchers involved

In his book Sykewar, Lerner writes,

"In its 'cold war' with Soviet Union... The United States is offering mainly dollars... to produce more 'good things of life'... Should it turn out that... the 'good things' we offer are not adequate competition against the 'better world' offered by Soviets, we shall need some new policy decisions... Here we shall need to consult the intelligence specialists (the social scientists) and the communication specialist (the propagandist) - rather than or in addition to the diplomat, the economist and the soldier"
