= Carlos Arguelles =

Filipino architect

- Born: Carlos D. Corcuera Arguelles; September 15, 1917; Manila, Philippine Islands
- Died: August 19, 2008 (aged 90); Manila, Philippines
- Occupation: Architect

Carlos D. Arguelles (September 15, 1917 – August 19, 2008) was a Filipino architect who was known for being a leading proponent of the International Style of architecture in the Philippines in the 1960s. He was an Eagle Scout and a Distinguished Eagle Scout Awardee of the Boy Scouts of America.

== Background ==
Born in Manila, he was the fifth son of Tomas Arguelles, a known pre-war Filipino architect, and Carmen Corcuera. Carlos followed in his father's footsteps and graduated in 1940 from the architecture program in the University of Santo Tomas. He continued his studies at the Massachusetts Institute of Technology where he earned his bachelor's degree in architecture in 1941.

The outbreak of World War II interrupted his masteral studies as he enlisted in the army, eventually assigned to be alongside Manuel Quezon and the Philippine Commonwealth government-in-exile in Washington, D.C., and as an intelligence officer under General Chuck Parsons in Australia. He returned to MIT after the war to complete his master's degree in architecture, which he obtained in 1946.

He died on August 19, 2008, in Manila, Philippines, 27 days before his 91st birthday.

== Career ==
Arguelles returned to the Philippines in 1949 and began his architecture career in the country as an associate of Gines Rivera, the architect behind the planning of the Ateneo de Manila University campus being built at that time in Loyola Heights in Quezon City. He also began teaching at the UST College of Architecture and served as its dean from 1953 to 1959.

Arguelles first came into prominence in Philippine architecture thanks to his role as chief architect of Philamlife Homes in Quezon City, the first gated community in the country, as he designed many of the bungalow houses which were suited to the Filipino middle-class lifestyle. He would then move on to design other notable landmarks, including Philamlife's headquarters in Ermita in 1962 and the Manila Hilton right across it in 1968.

He was also involved with a number of professional societies such as the American Institute of Architects and the Philippine Institute of Architects, as well as socio-civic and religious organizations such as Rotary Chamber of Manila, Philippine Motor Association, Men of the Sacred Heart of the Sanctuario de San Antonio Parish. He was a recipient of the prestigious Gold Medal of Merit by the Philippine Institute of Architects in 1988, the Papal Award "Pro Ecclesiae et Pontifice" in 1996; "Centennial Honors for the Arts" from the Cultural Center of the Philippines in 1999.

== Works ==
Works
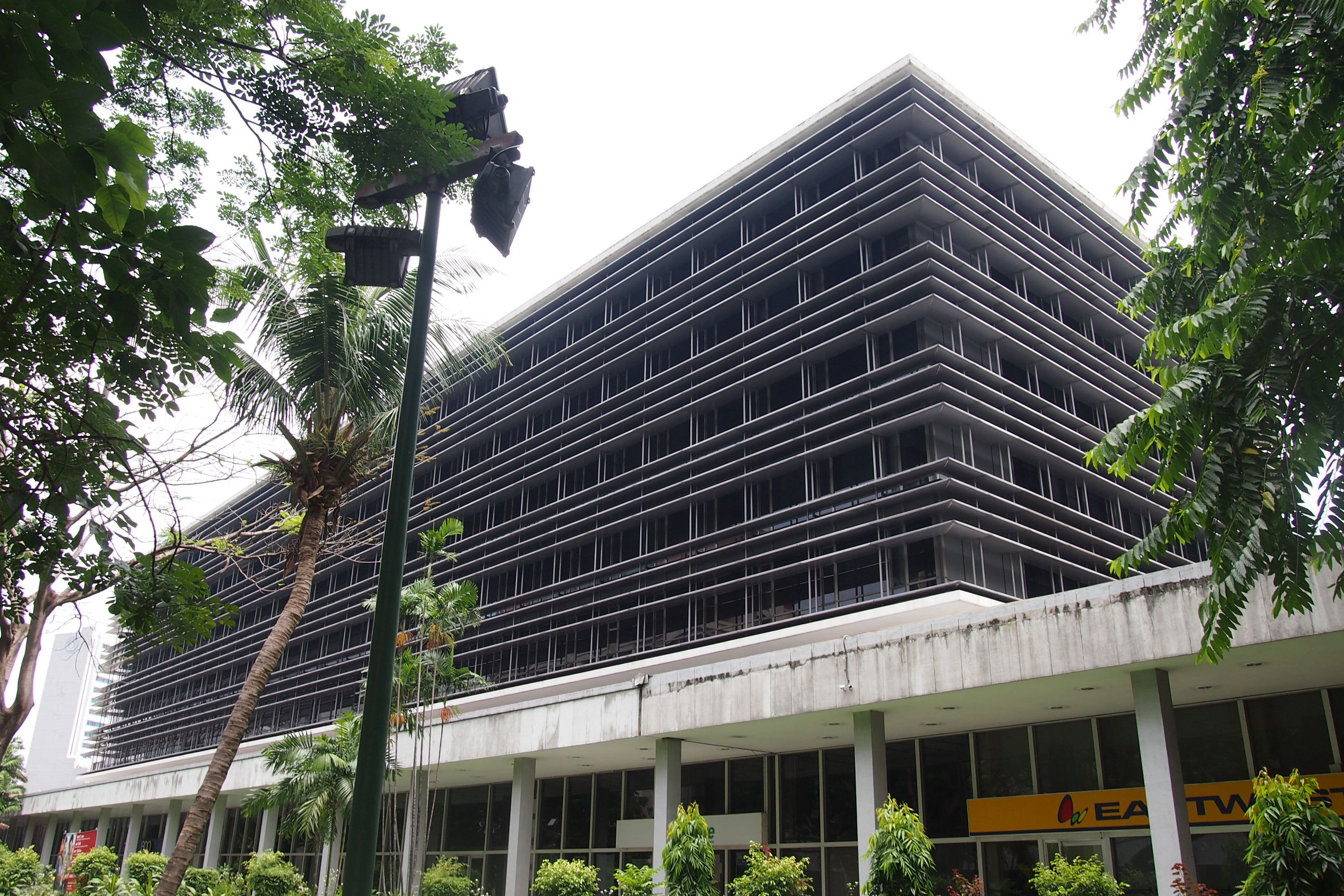
Philamlife Building in Ermita

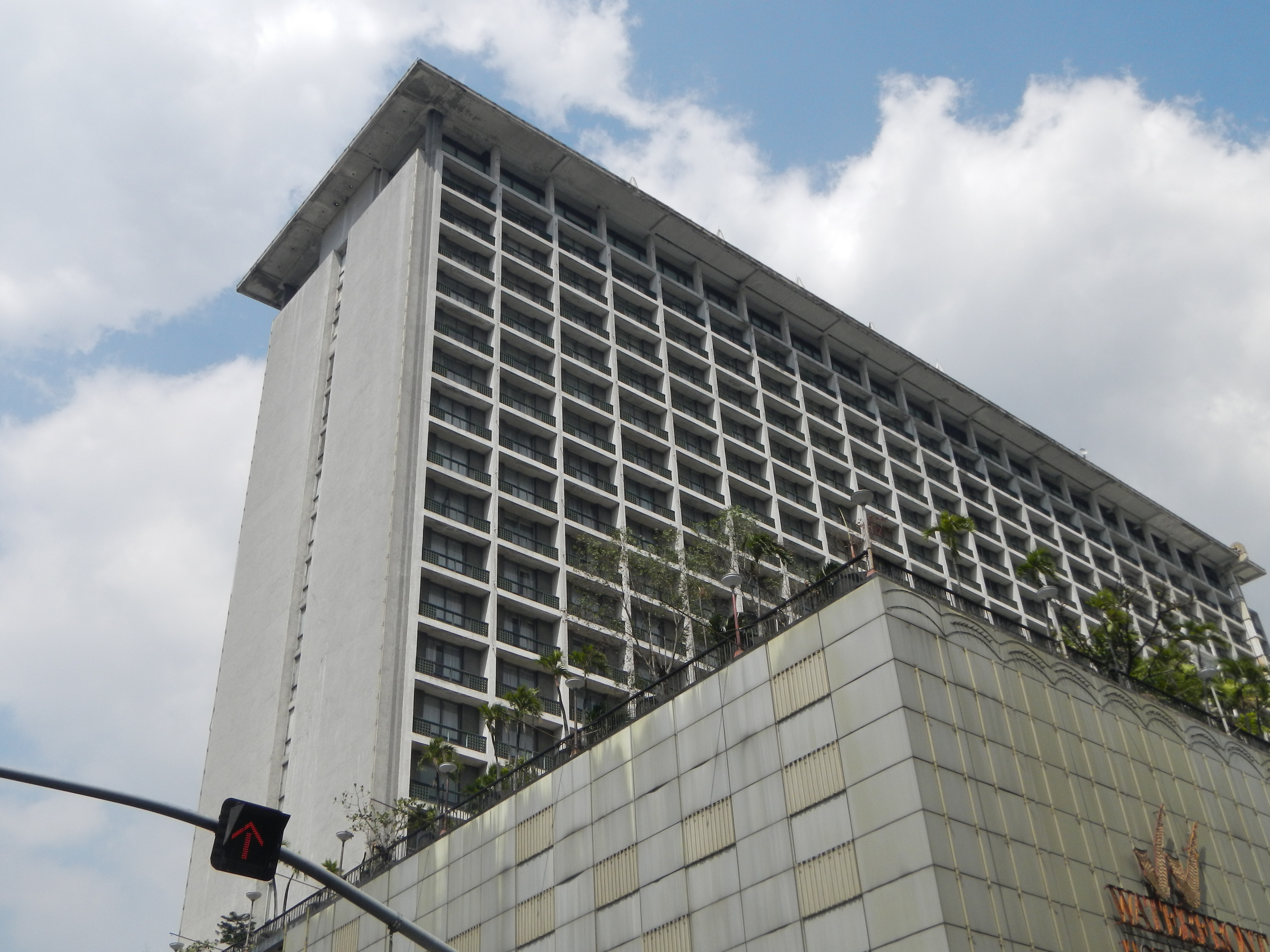
Manila Pavilion Hotel (formerly Manila Hilton)

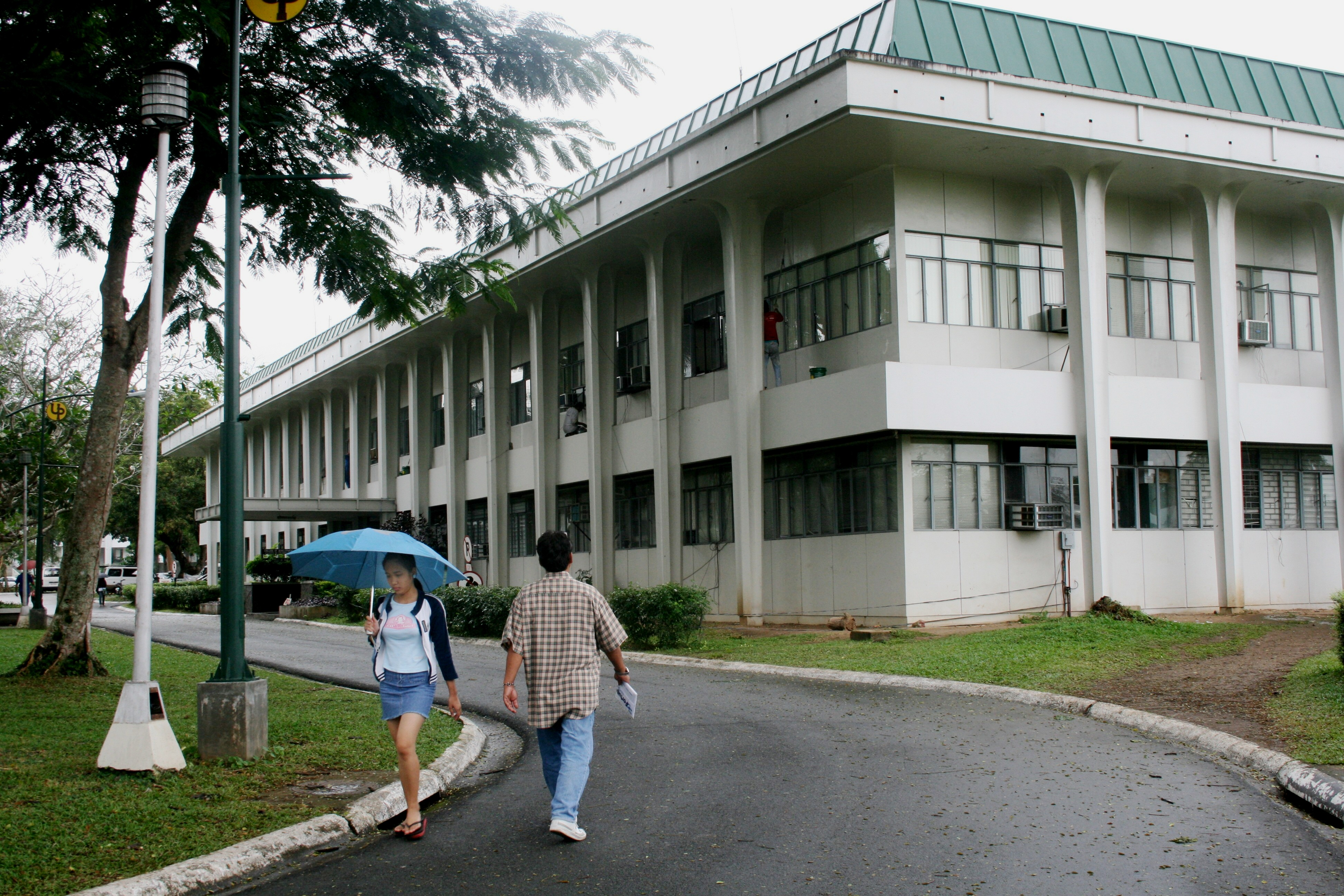
Nora C. Quebral Hall of UPLB College of Development Communication

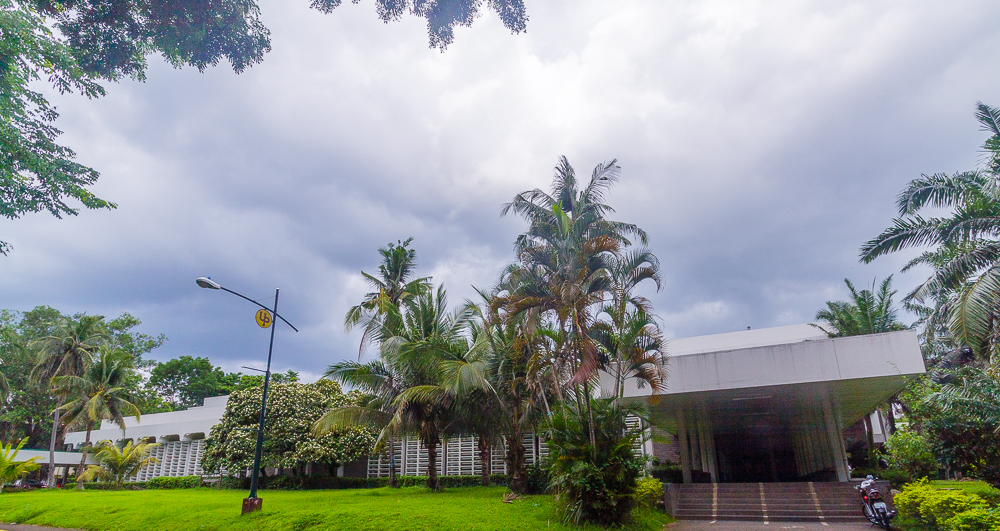
Leopoldo B. Uichanco Hall (formerly the Biological Sciences Building), UPLB
- ABS-CBN Broadcasting Center, Diliman, Quezon City
- Philamlife Homes, Quezon City
- Philamlife Building, Manila (demolished)
- Manila Hilton Hotel (now Manila Pavilion Hotel, Manila)
- Development Bank of the Philippines Building, Makati
- Philippine National Bank Building (formerly as Manila Central College, Manila; demolished)
- PNB Makati Center (formerly Allied Bank Center)
- Manilabank Building, (Now VGP Center) Makati
- Solid Bank Building, (now PSBank Tower) Makati
- Cathedral of the Holy Child (IFI National Cathedral), Manila
- Magallanes Theater, Makati (now demolished, replaced by Magallanes Barangay Hall)
- Nora C. Quebral Hall (College of Development Communication) and Abelardo Samonte Hall (College of Agriculture and Food Science Administration Building) in University of the Philippines Los Baños, Laguna
- Leopoldo B. Uichanco Hall (formerly the Biological Sciences Building) in University of the Philippines Los Baños, Laguna
- International Rice Research Institute Building, Los Baños, Laguna
- Quad Theaters and Shopping Arcade, Makati (replaced by Glorietta)
- Encarnacion Hall, University of the Philippines School of Economics, Diliman, Quezon City
