= Philippine Philharmonic Orchestra =

- Short name: PPO
- Former name: CCP Philharmonic
- Founded: 1973
- Location: Pasay, Metro Manila, Philippines
- Concert hall: Main Theater, Cultural Center of the Philippines Complex
- Website: PPO at CCP

The Philippine Philharmonic Orchestra (PPO) is the resident symphony orchestra of the Cultural Center of the Philippines (CCP). It is currently under the musical direction of its resident conductor Grzegorz Nowak, and associate conductor, Dr. Herminigildo Ranera.

== History ==
Inaugurated on May 15, 1973, as the CCP Philharmonic, the new orchestra was initially intended to accompany artists performing at the Cultural Center of the Philippines. Its first music director was Luis Valencia, with Julian Quirit serving as concertmaster. Six years later Imelda Marcos, then first lady of the Philippines, asked Oscar Yatco to reorganize the ensemble, and in 1982 the Philippine Philharmonic Orchestra took its present name.

The PPO has performed under such conductors as Mendi Rodan, Piero Gamba, Yaacov Bergman, Jeffery Meyer, and Nicholas Koch. It has also collaborated with premier foreign concertists such as Van Cliburn, Renata Tebaldi, Monique Duphil, Anthony Camden, Judith Engel and David Benoit; and leading Filipino artistes including Cecile Licad, Lea Salonga, Martin Nievera, and Regine Velasquez.

Overseas, the PPO successfully toured Europe and, in 2001, performed for Asia Orchestra Week at the Tokyo Opera City Concert Hall. The orchestra also gave a 2004 Charity Royal Command Concert at Bangkok's National Theater at the invitation of Princess Galyani Vadhana, elder sister of King Bhumibol Adulyadej of Thailand. This was a project of the Fund for Classical Music Promotion, a non-profit organization providing scholarships to young musicians to further their musical studies (in cooperation with the Embassy of the Philippines in Bangkok and the Ministry of Culture of Thailand).

In 2006, the PPO's tour of the United States helped celebrate the centennial of the first Filipino migrants to Hawaii and California.

In 2009, after an exhaustive two-year search process, the PPO and the Cultural Center of the Philippines selected Olivier Ochanine as the PPO's next principal conductor and music director to start January 2010. Under the leadership of Ochanine, the Philippine Philharmonic Orchestra became the first Filipino orchestra to perform in New York's Carnegie Hall in 2016, featuring violinist Diomedes Saraza Jr. playing the Sibelius Violin Concerto and pianist Cecile Licad playing Rachmaninoff's Piano Concerto No. 2.

In May 2016 Japanese conductor Yoshikazu Fukumura became the principal conductor of the orchestra.

== See also ==
- Culture of the Philippines
