= Radyo Katipunan =

Radio station in the Philippines

Coordinates: 14.63634694°N 121.08006876°E

- Quezon City; Philippines
- Broadcast area: Selected parts of Metro Manila
- Frequency: 87.9 MHz
- Branding: Radyo Katipunan 87.9 FM

Programming
- Format: College Radio, Religious Radio
- Affiliations: Voice of America; Rappler (during newscasts)

Ownership
- Owner: Jesuit Communications Foundation

History
- First air date: August 28, 2018

Technical information
- Power: 10 watts
- ERP: 20 watts

Links
- Webcast: Listen Live
- Website: jescom.ph/radyo-katipunan Radyo Katipunan on Facebook

Radyo Katipunan (87.9 FM) is a low-power campus radio station owned and operated by the Jesuit Communications Foundation in coordination with the Ateneo de Manila University. Its studios are located at Sonolux Building along Seminary Drive, and transmitter located within the university, both in its Loyola campus along Katipunan Ave., Barangay Loyola Heights, Quezon City. Radyo Katipunan serves as a community station for the Ateneo de Manila campus and surrounding area.

== History ==
In October 2016, Ateneo de Manila University was granted a temporary broadcast permit by the National Telecommunications Commission, with its broadcast equipment donated by Ateneo alumnus and KBP Corporate Secretary José Yabut.

In the third quarter of 2017, the station began test broadcasts under the name Ateneo Campus Radio. It had its soft launch as Radyo Katipunan on February 14, 2018, which was both Ash Wednesday and Valentine's Day. This time, it was jointly run by ADMU and JesCom.

=== Launch ===
On August 28, 2018, Radyo Katipunan was officially launched, with the addition of simulcasting Church-run Veritas 846 in the morning. In addition, the station provided news updates from Rappler and Voice of America.

=== Pandemic and “Keep the Faith” Masses ===
At the start of the COVID-19 pandemic and resulting nationwide lockdowns in March 2020, Radyo Katipunan began daily broadcasts of morning Mass as "Keeping the Faith" (KTF). It was rebranded as "Keep the Faith: Daily Mass for Hope and Healing", before changing to its subtitle "Daily Mass with the Jesuits". Apart from the Easter Triduum, KTF airs every day of the year even when Radyo Katipunan is off air. Even after lockdowns were lifted and there was a return to on-campus activity, KTF still has a devoted online following.

KTF began broadcasting from the studio as all other programs were done online. The Mass then moved to JesCom's Studio A (the group recording studio), before finally moving to its Chapel Studio in 2023.

== See also ==
- DZUP 1602
- DLSU Green Giant FM
- UST Tiger Radio
- Ateneo de Manila University
