= AIA Philippines =

Philippines-based insurance company

- Formerly: Philippine American Life and General Insurance Company; Philam Life
- Industry: Financial services
- Founded: June 21, 1947; 79 years ago
- Founders: Cornelius Vander Starr; Earl Carroll
- Headquarters: 23/F 8767 Philam Life Tower, Paseo De Roxas, Makati City
- Area served: Philippines
- Key people: Wing-Shing (Jacky) Chan (Chairman); Kelvin Ang (President and CEO)
- Products: Insurance, annuities, mutual funds
- Revenue: ₱20.88 billion (2019)
- Operating income: ₱9.19 billion (2019)
- Net income: ₱7.69 billion (2019)
- Total assets: ₱292.97 billion (2019)
- Total equity: ₱91.2 billion (2019)
- Parent: AIA Group
- Website: aia.com.ph/en/index.html

AIA Philippines is the commonly used contraction of AIA Philippines Life and General Insurance Company Inc. (formerly known as the Philippine American Life and General Insurance Company or Philam Life), an insurance company based in the Philippines. As of 2020 it was one of the largest life insurance companies in the country by both assets and net worth.

== History ==
The Philam Life logo, used from 2009 to 2021

AIA Philippines was founded in 1947 as Philam Life by Cornelius Vander Starr, the founder of American International Group, Inc. (AIG), and his partner Earl Carroll.

In 1961 the company inaugurated its office, the Philam Life Building in Ermita, Manila, and it soon became a landmark structure as well as a center for culture and the arts. The building would serve as the company's headquarters until 2013 when it moved to the Bonifacio Global City in Taguig, and then to the AIA Tower in Makati in 2023, both in Metro Manila.

The company has received various awards over the years, including the Asian Management Award for General Management, the Asian Management Award for Financial Management, and the Reader's Digest Platinum Trusted Brand Award. It also received a Presidential Citation from the Philippine government in 1994.

== Corporate restructuring ==
Philam Life was part of AIG until 2009, when it and two other AIG subsidiaries – American International Assurance (AIA) and ALICO – were placed under the administration of a special purpose vehicle in exchange for a bailout by the Federal Reserve Bank of New York. On November 3, 2009 AIA bought a 99.78% stake in Philam Life after approval from government regulators, and on November 27, 2009 this new Philam Life bought a 51% stake in Ayala Life and formed a joint venture with the Bank of the Philippine Islands (BPI). Ayala Life was renamed BPI-Philam Life Assurance Corporation (BPI-Philam) in 2010.

In 2013 Philam Life became AIA's Top Performing Company across the 17 countries in the AIA Group, winning the AIA Champion's League Gold Cup and the Premier League Champion Cup that year. On August 9, 2021 Philam Life officially changed its name to AIA Philippines.

== Office buildings ==
=== Manila office ===
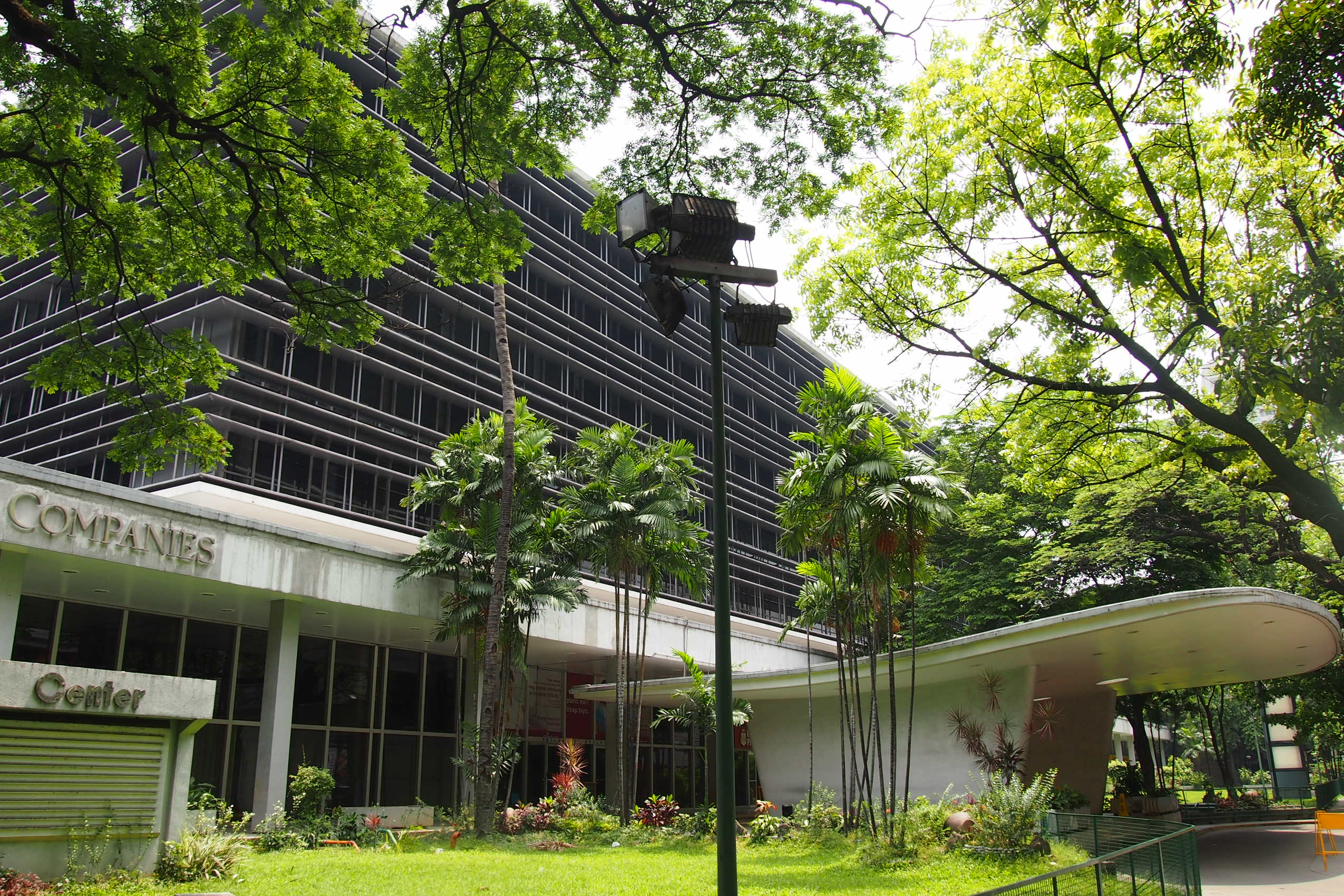
Philam Life Building in Manila, photographed in 2012

The Philam Life Building in Ermita, Manila was the original headquarters of the company.

Designed by Carlos Arguelles and completed in 1961, the building was one of the first structures built in the Philippines in the International Style of architecture. The medium-rise block was rectangular with a centralized core that allowed some 20,000 square meters of office space to be daylit through the use of wraparound ribbon window glazing and aluminum sunshades supported by pipes. The entrance canopies and roof for the complex's auditorium were made of sculpted concrete, and Arguelles used the artwork of Filipino artists to decorate the interior, including that of Galo Ocampo and Vicente Manansala. The building was best known for its 780-seat Philam Life Theater, whose excellent acoustics were designed by Bolt, Beranek and Newman and were highly suitable for classical music. Overall, its design was considered a model for other Philam Life buildings.

In 2013 Philam Life moved its headquarters to Bonifacio Global City in Taguig and sold the Ermita site to mall developer SM Development Corp (SMDC). The demolition of the Ermita site began on August 5, 2020, amid the COVID-19 pandemic.

=== Makati office ===
Through its real estate affiliate, AIA Philippines owns the AIA Tower (formerly the Philam Life Tower) on Paseo de Roxas in Makati. The 14th-tallest building in the Philippines, the building was inaugurated in 2000 and has served as AIA Philippines' headquarters since 2023.

=== Cebu office ===
The company also built a ₱2.1 billion 17-storey corporate center within the Ayala-owned Cebu Business Park on Cardinal Rosales Avenue. Completed in 2017 and facing Ayala Center Cebu, it replaced the Brutalist Style building that had served as AIA Philippines' Cebu regional office on Osmeña Boulevard (formerly Jones Avenue) in uptown Cebu City. AIA Philippines' original office on Osmeña Boulevard later became the corporate headquarters of Virginia Food, a local processed meat manufacturer.
