= AIA Tower (Makati) =

- BPI Philam Life Building as seen from Ayala Avenue in 2022
- Interactive map of the AIA Tower area

General information
- Status: Completed
- Type: Office
- Location: 8767 Paseo de Roxas, Makati, Philippines
- Coordinates: 14°33′26.37″N 121°1′19.11″E
- Construction started: 1995
- Opening: 2000
- Owner: AIA Philippines Life and General Insurance Company, Philam Properties Corporation, PERF Realty Corporation, and Social Security System
- Management: Philam Properties Corporation

Height
- Roof: 200 m (656.17 ft)

Technical details
- Floor count: 48 upper + 5 basement
- Floor area: 900,000 sq ft (83,612.74 m^{2})
- Lifts/elevators: 21

Design and construction
- Architects: Skidmore, Owings & Merrill, LLP - New York, in cooperation with W.V. Coscolluela & Associates
- Developer: Philam Properties Corporation
- Structural engineer: Aromin & Sy + Associates, Inc.
- Main contractor: E.E. Black, Ltd. / EEI Corporation J.V.

The AIA Tower, formerly the Philamlife Tower, is an office skyscraper located in Makati, Philippines. It is owned and developed by Philam Properties Corporation, the real estate arm of the Philippine American Life and General Insurance Company (Philamlife, now AIA Philippines). Standing at 200 meters (660 ft), it is currently the 7th-tallest building in Makati, and is the 14th-tallest building in the country and Metro Manila as well. The building has 48 floors above ground, and 5 basement levels for parking. It is also the current headquarters of AIA Philippines since 2023, which was renamed to AIA Tower.

== Location ==
Street-level view from Valero Access Road 3

The building is located inside the Makati Central Business District along Paseo de Roxas in Makati, just a few meters away from its intersection with Ayala Avenue. The building is directly across the Ayala Triangle. It is a walk away from most of Makati's other major office buildings including the erstwhile tallest office building in the country, the PBCom Tower, and entertainment centers including Ayala Center.

== Design ==
The Philamlife Tower was designed by international architectural firm Skidmore, Owings & Merrill, LLP in association with local architecture firm W.V. Coscoluella & Associates as Architect of Record. Project and construction management works was provided by American firm Turner International and local company Jose Aliling & Associates, while construction of the building was made by the general contractor company EEI Corporation.

The 48-storey office building has large column-free floor plates, and uses fully unitized curtain wall of glass, aluminium panel and granite. The tower proper is incorporated into the system horizontal sunscreens, vertical fins, light bullnoses, crown lighting and balcony trellises. Shallow and deep-set cladding was used extensively on the building envelope. The entrance facades employed mirror stainless steel shopfronts, capped with functional sculpted canopies in hairline finish.

== Amenities ==
Among its many features include: 100% raised flooring, which provides space beneath the floor for cabling and wiring, advanced structured cabling systems, automatic parking sensor system, double paned curtain wall, fully integrated building management and proximity card access system, provision for 24-hour air conditioning, 16 high speed elevators, and a helipad. It also has eight corner offices per floor to a private club facility, as well as, a cafeteria for tenants.

The Philamlife building incorporates 60,000 square meters (650,000 sq ft) of prime leasable office space, a private club facility, two major banking halls and required support services.

It also has The Tower Club, a private business club for corporate executives at the 33rd and 34th floors. The club has an executive boardroom, six function or private dining rooms, two restaurants and a bar. The club also houses a fitness center.

== See also ==
- List of tallest buildings in the Philippines
