= DYUP-AM =

DYUP
Iloilo; Philippines
- Broadcast area: Miagao, Iloilo
- Frequency: 873 KHz
- Branding: UPV Radio

Programming
- Format: Entertainment, College Radio, Infotainment, Music

Ownership
- Owner: University of the Philippines Visayas
- Sister stations: DYUP-FM

History
- First air date: 1964
- Call sign meaning: DY; University of the Philippines

Technical information
- Power: 5,000 watts
- ERP: 10,000 watts

Links
- Website: www.upv.edu.ph

DYUP 873 AM is a music, news and non-commercial educational AM college radio station operating in Miagao, Iloilo. The radio format of the station is for student information, entertainment, technology transfer, news and music. This also serves as training ground for Broadcasting and Communication students.

== See also ==
- DYUP-FM
- DZUP
