= DZLB-FM =

LBFM 97.4 (DZLB-FM)
- Los Baños; Philippines
- Broadcast area: Laguna and surrounding areas
- Frequency: 97.4 MHz
- Branding: LBFM 97.4

Programming
- Format: Community radio, College radio

Ownership
- Owner: UPLB College of Development Communication
- Sister stations: DZLB-AM

History
- First air date: 1964
- Call sign meaning: DZ; Los Baños

Technical information
- Class: D (campus provincial)
- Power: 1,000 watts
- ERP: 2,500 watts

DZLB (97.4 FM), broadcasting as LBFM 97.4, is a radio station owned and operated by the University of the Philippines Los Baños - College of Development Communication. Its studio and transmitters are located in the DZLB Broadcast Studio of UP Los Baños College, Los Baños, Laguna. It is the premiere college radio station in the Philippines. It started operation in the early-90s.

Its programming includes music programs and talk shows. Broadcasts are done from Monday to Friday, 3:00 PM to 7:00 PM. However, during weekends and breaks between semesters, the station is off the air. It also serves as the community radio station of U.P. Los Baños and other neighboring communities.

The station is under the direct supervision of the Department of Development Broadcasting and Telecommunication (DDBT) of the College of Development Communication. The station's broadcast team consists of volunteer student broadcasters from student organizations The UPLB Jocks and some members of the UP Community Broadcasters' Society.

== See also ==
- DZUP
- DZLB
