= Daniel Lerner =

American scholar (1917–1980)

- Born: Daniel Tom Lerner; October 30, 1917; Brooklyn, NY
- Died: May 1, 1980 (aged 62)
- Education: B.A., New York University; Ph.D., New York University
- Occupations: Writer, Academic
- Writing career
- Language: English
- Notable work: The Passing of Traditional Society: Modernizing the Middle East

Daniel Lerner (1917–1980) was an American scholar and writer known for his studies on modernization theory. Lerner's study of Balgat Turkey played a critical role in shaping American ideas about the use of mass media and US cultural products to promote economic and social development in post-colonial nations. In 1958, he wrote the seminal book The Passing of Traditional Society: Modernizing the Middle East. Scholars have argued that the research project that formed the basis of the book emerged from intelligence requirements in the US government, and was a result of the contract between the Office of International Broadcasting and Columbia University.

He, along with Wilbur Schramm and Everett Rogers, were influential in launching the study and practice of media development and development communication.

== Education ==
Lerner obtained his doctorate from New York University in 1948, submitting a dissertation about the conduct of psychological warfare against Germany during the time between D-Day and VE-Day, which was published as Sykewar (1949).

== Career ==
Lerner was Ford Professor of Economics at the Massachusetts institute of Technology (MIT). He became a visiting professor of economics and social sciences at MIT for three years starting in 1953, an associate professor of economics in 1956, and a full professor of economics and political science in 1958. He became a Life Fellow of the International Institute of Arts and Letters in 1962, and retired from teaching in 1976.

== Criticism ==
In his book Sykewar, Lerner writes,

"In its 'cold war' with Soviet Union... The United States is offering mainly dollars... to produce more 'good things of life'... Should it turn out that... the 'good things' we offer are not adequate competition against the 'better world' offered by Soviets, we shall need some new policy decisions... Here we shall need to consult the intelligence specialists (the social scientists) and the communication specialist (the propagandist) - rather than or in addition to the diplomat, the economist and the soldier"

Lerner's involvement in the Bureau of Applied Social Research project that Traditional Society was based on has been criticized to be violating ethical considerations of research. The research was conducted as a field survey in Turkey, Greece, Germany, Lebanon, Israel, Syria, Egypt, Iraq, Iran & Jordan, with special focus on Turkey. In all, 1600 interviews were used for the book. Samarajiva writes that even though the original purpose of research had been said to be about empathy and media participation, many of the questions in the survey had to do with foreign radio broadcast and sentiments regarding US, UK and USSR. The questionnaire consisted of 9 questions about movies, 17 about newspapers and 49 about radio. Of the 49 questions about radio, 23 were about foreign broadcasting. In fact, Samarajiva writes that,

"A restricted document from the Program Evaluation Branch, International Broadcasting Division, Department of State, titled 'Projected Research Plans' and issued prior to the actual research, lists the questions Voice of America was interested in having asked. These questions had corresponding questions in the BASR project as well."

He, therefore, argues that BASR research formed the basis to find target audiences for Voice of America. According to the ethics of research as outlined by Ithiel de Sola Pool, the research project did not adequately concern itself with ethics of research. The researchers did not:

- fully disclose the sponsors of the research in their host countries,
- fully reveal to the native researchers the purposes of the research,
- adequately publish the results of the research in the host countries,
- ensure the safety of the researchers involved

== Works ==
- Daniel Lerner (1958) The Passing of Traditional Society: Modernizing the Middle East. New York: Free Press.
- Daniel Lerner. (1972) Communication for Development Administration in Southeast Asia. Asia Society—SEADAG.
- Schramm, Wilbur., & Lerner, David. (Eds.). (1976). Communication and change: The last ten years and the next. Honolulu, HI: University of Hawaii Press.
- Lerner, Daniel, Lyle M. Nelson, and Wilbur Lang Schramm. (1977) Communication Research: A Half-Century Appraisal. Published for the East-West Center by University Press of Hawaii.
- Lasswell, Harold Dwight, Daniel Lerner, and Hans Speier. The Symbolic Instrument in Early Times. East-West Center, 1979.
