= Olivier Ochanine =

French conductor and flutist (born 1979)

Olivier Fabrice Ochanine (born September 7, 1979) is a French/American conductor; he is founding Music Director and Principal Conductor of the Sun Symphony Orchestra of Hanoi, Vietnam and the former Music Director and Principal Conductor of the Philippine Philharmonic Orchestra (PPO), the national orchestra of the Philippines.

Ochanine holds a master's degree in Conducting from the University of Southern California and pursued a Doctorate in Orchestral Conducting, at the Cincinnati College - Conservatory of Music, before taking up his post with the Philippine Philharmonic.

== Professional career ==
Olivier Ochanine is the 1st Prize Winner of the 2015 Antal Dorati International Conducting Competition in Budapest, Hungary, in which he surpassed nearly 120 other conductors from 23 countries; the prize leads to further performances in Europe. In addition, he is winner of the prestigious The American Prize (2015) in the Professional Orchestra Conducting division. Ochanine is also 2nd Prize Winner in the 2015 London Classical Soloists International Conducting Competition.

A native of Paris, Ochanine began music studies in France. He continued music studies in the United States, and expanded his focus to orchestral conducting, taking up graduate studies and attending master classes with some of the best conducting mentors, including Mark Gibson, Gustav Meier, Marin Alsop, Larry Livingston, Robert Baldwin, John Barnett, and John Farrer. He obtained his master's degree in Conducting from the University of Southern California (USC), and in 2009, began his Doctoral Studies in Orchestral Conducting at the Cincinnati College-Conservatory of Music under Mark Gibson.

A flutist and bassist, Ochanine earned his bachelor's degree from the University of Kentucky. He has also played as bassist for the Lexington Philharmonic Orchestra.

Ochanine has been invited to the California Conductors Institute several times. In 2009, Ochanine was among a handful of conductors nationally to be invited by Baltimore Symphony Orchestra Music Director Marin Alsop to conduct in the Cabrillo Music Festival in Santa Cruz, California and to participate in a conducting workshop.

Ochanine's term with the Philippine Philharmonic Orchestra, the nation's leading orchestra, started with the 2010-2011 performance season. Under his leadership, the orchestra performed numerous Philippine premieres and made its first recording in over a decade. Ochanine has also been credited for greatly improving the level of the PPO's playing.

In the Philippines, Ochanine was an active musician, leading masterclasses of chamber music at schools; he has also led conducting masterclasses for the Cultural Center of the Philippines. As part of his outreach mission, Ochanine served for several years as head visiting conductor for the Orchestra of the Filipino Youth, a program geared toward talented youth that stem from severely unfortunate financial backgrounds.

In 2016, Ochanine's project to bring the Philippine Philharmonic Orchestra to Carnegie Hall materialized after years of fundraising and planning, making this the first time a Filipino orchestra has performed in the famed venue.

He has conducted, among many others, the Budapest MAV Symphony Orchestra, Slovak State Philharmonic (Košice), Moscow State Symphony Orchestra, and Gyor Philharmonic Orchestra, Thailand Philharmonic Orchestra, Evergreen Symphony Orchestra. Ochanine regularly collaborates with world-class artists, and has concerts with soloists Jean-Yves Thibaudet, Alexei Volodin, Sergei Nakariakov, Sumi Jo and many others.
