= DYUP-FM =

DYUP
- Miagao; Philippines
- Broadcast area: Miagao
- Frequency: 102.7 MHz
- Branding: DYUP 102.7

Programming
- Languages: English, Filipino
- Format: College Radio

Ownership
- Owner: University of the Philippines Visayas
- Sister stations: DYUP-AM

History
- Call sign meaning: University of the Philippines

Technical information
- Licensing authority: NTC
- Power: 1,000 watts
- ERP: 5,000 watts

Links
- Website: www.upv.edu.ph

DYUP (102.7 FM) is a radio station owned and operated by the University of the Philippines Visayas under the Division of Humanities. The station's studio and transmitter are located at the College of Arts and Sciences, UPV Campus, Miagao.
