= DZLB-AM =

DZLB

Los Baños; Philippines
- Broadcast area: Laguna and surrounding areas
- Frequency: 1116 kHz
- Branding: Radyo DZLB 1116

Programming
- Languages: Filipino, English
- Format: College Radio

Ownership
- Owner: UPLB College of Development Communication
- Sister stations: DZLB-FM

History
- First air date: 1964 (First Airing date); 2008 (Relaunch date)
- Former frequencies: 1200 kHz (1964–1978)
- Call sign meaning: Los Baños

Technical information
- Licensing authority: NTC
- Power: 5,000 watts

DZLB (1116 AM) is a college radio station owned and operated by the University of the Philippines Los Baños through its College of Development Communication. Its studio is located at the DZLB Broadcast Studio, 2nd Floor, College of Development Communication Building, UP Los Baños, Laguna.

It is being used as an experimental radio station of the Department of Development Broadcasting and Telecommunication. Its programming includes music programs and request shows, informative segments and talk shows and School-on-air programs.

== History ==
Radyo DZLB was established in 1964 by the University of the Philippines Los Baños to provide educational programming to rural communities surrounding Los Baños. The station originally broadcast at 1200 kHz with a power of 250 watts. In 1978, the frequency was changed to 1116 kHz.

DZLB won a KBP Golden Dove Award for Best AM Station in 1994 and a Catholic Mass Media Award for Best Educational Radio Program in 2010.

In 2005, the station went inactive due to lack of equipment. Three years after, in October 2008, the station went back on-air with a more powerful transmitter & equipment. Since December 1 of the same year, DZLB broadcasts from 6:00AM to 12:00NN, Mondays to Sundays.

Near the end of the first semester of Academic Year 2011-2012, construction for the station's new antenna tower began, causing the station to go off-air. On April 9, 2012, it went back on the air.

== See also ==
- DZUP
- DZLB-FM
