= Global South Development Magazine =

International online developmental magazine

- Editor: Manoj Kr. Bhusal; More than 60 global volunteers
- Categories: Political magazine
- Frequency: Quarterly until 2015, online since then
- Founded: 2010
- Final issue: 2015 (print)
- Company: Silcreation, Finland (2009–2017); Global South Media Action (2018–present)
- Based in: Helsinki
- Language: English
- Website: www.gsdmagazine.org
- ISSN: 1799-0769

Global South Development Magazine (GSDM) is an online magazine dedicated to international development issues. The magazine is inspired by the idea of citizen journalism and primarily covers developmental issues of developing countries. From 2010 to 2015, GSDM was a quarterly magazine published by a Finnish non-profit development media organisation Silver Lining Creation. As of 2018, the magazine is published by Helsinki-based media organization, Global South Media Action, which also runs the online education platform, UniDevv.

== History ==
The first issue of the quarterly magazine was published in March 2010 dedicating its first cover issue to the Copenhagen Climate Change Summit. Since then subsequent issues were published and were made available online. On 11 September 2011, the magazine team was expanded with an Assistant Editor and a number of other special correspondents The magazine team claimed that within a relatively short period of its inception, their publication had been received very well and still has an influential global readership. GSDM's distribution was free of charge. In 2012, the magazine launched a separate website] to archive its published articles and special reports. In 2013, GSDM introduced the concept of Development Reporters as an effort to encourage students of development studies and community activists to write about global development issues.

== The team ==
Global South Development Magazine has been run by its global editorial team which by June 2012 consisted of 40 professional volunteers from different parts of the world. The magazine has an executive editorial team, five regional editors, a group of special correspondents and numerous country reporters.

== Covered issues ==
April 2012 issue of Global South Development Magazine featuring conflict in the Democratic Republic of the Congo.

GSDM has covered many issues that range from development aid to environmental sustainability. On its October 2011 edition, the magazine criticized Apple Inc. for their poor philanthropy records. The magazine's April 2012 edition was dedicated to the Democratic Republic of the Congo with an in-depth report on the humanitarian situation in the country.

== Special correspondents ==
As of April 2014, 10 special correspondents reported on 10 different development themes prioritised by the magazine. Namely the themes were:

- Women's issues in Africa
- Global environmental issues
- Climate change
- Global Health
- Livelihood & Global Economic Affairs
- Global Education
- Development Aid
- Global Peace & Security Issues
- South-to-South Development Cooperation
- Development & Democracy in Africa
- Food Sovereignty and Rural Livelihoods

== Environmental concerns ==
Despite its "print-like" content and popularity, GSDM, reportedly, never issued printed copies because of the magazine's commitment to environment-friendly activities.

== See also ==
- Global South
- Developing countries
- Citizen Journalism
