= University of the Philippines Los Baños College of Development Communication =

Coordinates: 14°10′01.60″N 121°14′33.12″E

- Kolehiyo ng Komunikasyong Pangkaunlaran
- Established: 1954 (Office); 1998 (College)
- Chancellor: Jose V. Camacho Jr.
- Dean: Edmund G. Centeno
- Location: Los Baños, Laguna, Philippines
- Colors: Red
- Website: www.devcom.edu.ph

The College of Development Communication (CDC) is the ninth college established under the University of the Philippines Los Baños (UPLB). It offered the Philippines' first communication course in 1960, as a major under the Bachelor of Science in Agriculture curriculum. In 1974, it became the first to offer academic degree programs in development communication. In 1999, the College was named as one of two national centers of excellence in communication by the Philippines' Commission on Higher Education CHED. The College (through DZLB) was awarded a KBP Golden Dove Award for best AM station in 1994 and a Catholic Mass Media Award for Best Educational Radio Program in 2010. In December 2012, the College of Development Communication once again became a Center of Excellence for Development Communication.

== Degree Programs ==
The CDC currently offers four degree programs:

- Associate of Science in Development Communication (ASDC);
- Bachelor of Science in Development Communication (BSDC);
- Master of Science (MS) in Development Communication; and
- Doctor of Philosophy (PhD) in Development Communication.

It also conducts regular training workshops in coordination with various international organizations, government agencies and non-government organizations.

The college is planning on offering masteral programs in science communication and in journalism with a focus on data journalism and sustainability reporting.

== Departments ==
The CDC is currently organized into four departments:

- The Department of Development Broadcasting and Telecommunication (DDBT);
- The Department of Development Journalism (DDJ);
- The Department of Educational Communication (DEC); and
- The Department of Science Communication (DSC).

Each department used to represent a field of specialization the undergraduate student can focus on (DDBT represents Community Broadcasting), until the curriculum was revised in favor of a more generalist one.

== History ==
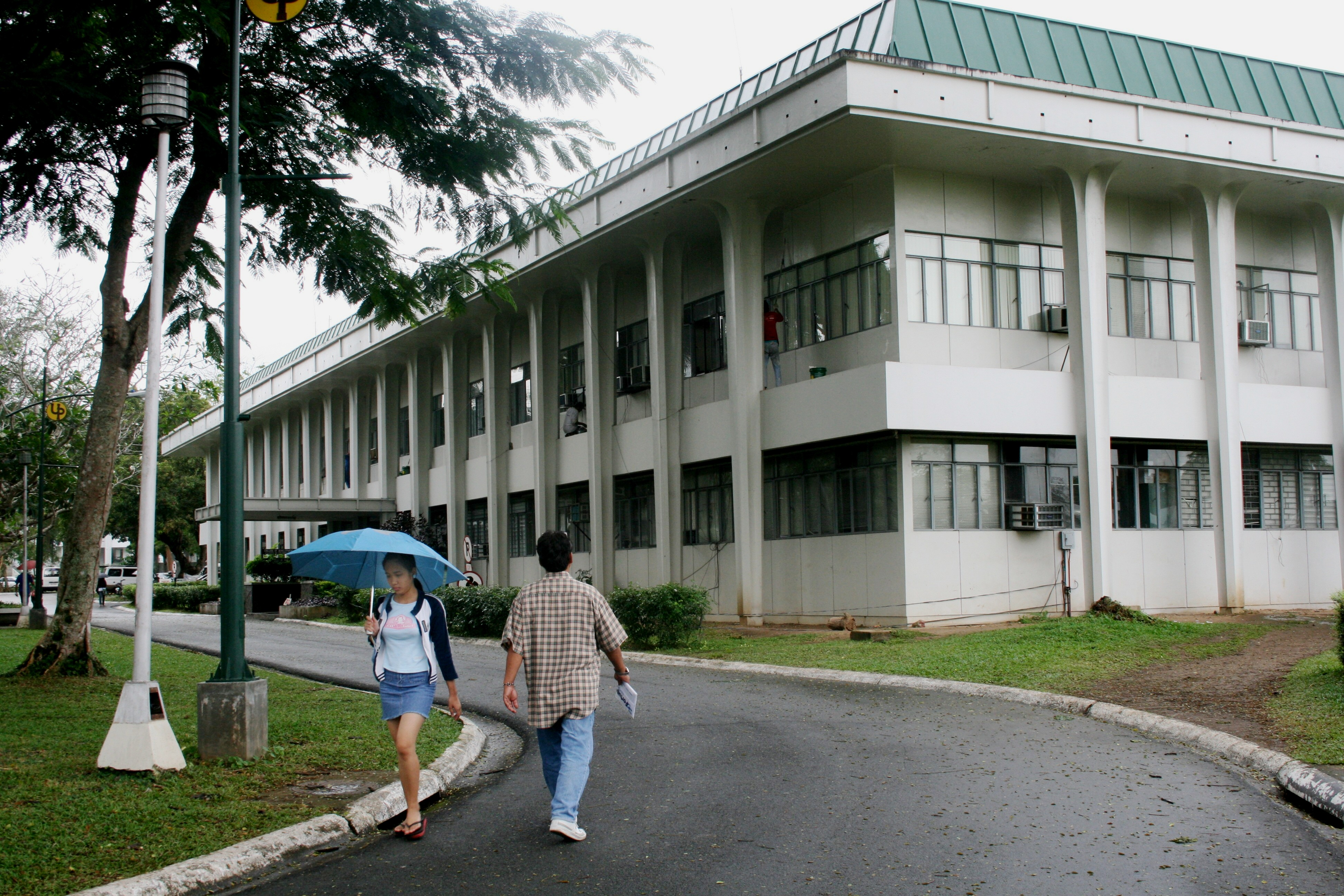
The Nora C. Quebral Hall of the College of Development Communication in the UP Los Baños Campus

In 1954, the UP College of Agriculture (UPCA) started put up the Office of Extension and Publications (CA-OEP). Among its recruits was Nora C. Quebral, who would later pioneer the academic field.

In 1962, the CA-OEP was elevated into the Department of Agricultural Information and Communication (DAIC), which offered the first communication course in the country in 1960, under the Bachelor of Science in Agriculture curriculum. The department was renamed the Department of Agricultural Communication in 1968.

In 1974, the world's first degree programs in development communication was offered by what was renamed the Department of Development Communication. It was again renamed when it was elevated into an institute (Institute of Development Communication) in 1987. It was elevated into a full college of UPLB on 18 December 1998.

== Location and Facilities ==
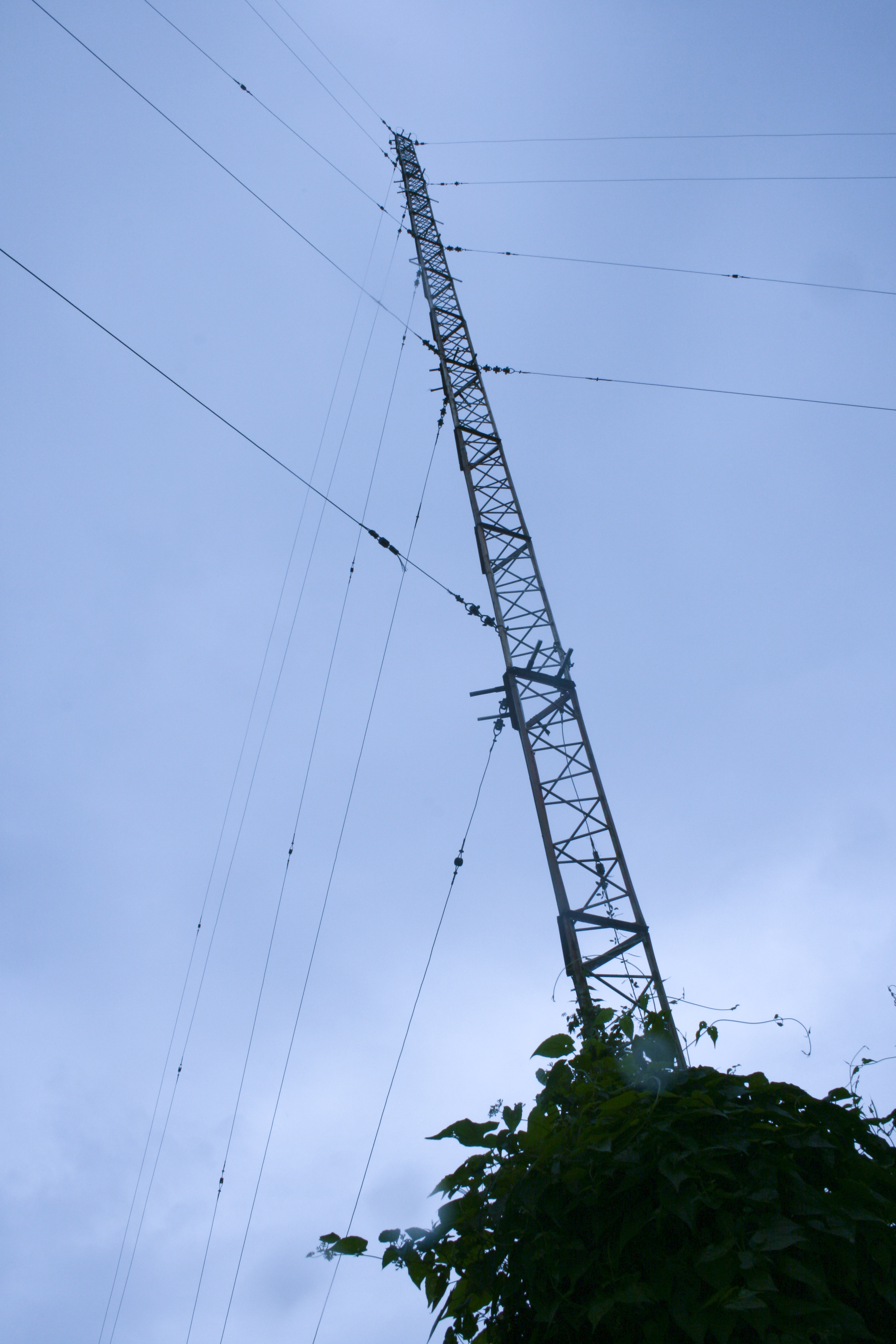
The DZLB AM Transmitter

The CDC is located at the University of the Philippines Los Baños campus in College, Laguna, Philippines. The UPLB campus is about 63 km southeast of Metro Manila. It is at the foot of the legendary Mt. Makiling, which hosts one of the few remaining rain forests in Luzon. It is also situated near international and regional research centers and science and technology parks.

The College's building is within UPLB's administration circle and is among the first buildings one sees when entering UPLB's main gate. It is adjacent to Carabao Park, which is UPLB's alumni plaza, and is right across the University's main administration building. The building is designed by Carlos Arguelles and was intended to be the offices of the UPCA Department of Agricultural Information and Communication (DAIC) and Farm and Home Development Office (FHDO). It was constructed as part of the UPCA development plan project under the deanship of Dioscoro Umali.

The CDC's facilities include experimental radio station DZLB AM, which broadcasts at 1116 kHz and serves as a developmental community radio station for Laguna, and its sister station LB FM, which broadcasts at 97.4 mHz and serves as the campus radio station. Photography students are allowed to use the college's two darkrooms, and two computer laboratories are intended for students studying instructional materials production and Information and Communication Technologies, respectively.

The CDC's reading room's collection of reading materials is specifically geared towards the use of communication to promote social development.

== Organizations ==
The college is host to a number of student organizations.

- The UPLB Development Communicators' Society (UPLB DevComSoc or DCS) - an "academic organization emphasizing the role of communication in promoting social change". Founded in 1972, UPLB DCS "advocates the study of development communication from which the Society has been founded."
- The UP Alliance of Development Communication Students (UP ADS) - an "academic-civic organization founded on August 20, 1997," envisioning "an organization where Devcom students can be mobilizers of change while maintaining academic excellence and fostering camaraderie among members."
- The UP Community Broadcasters' Society Inc. (UP ComBroadSoc) - a media-based socio-civic organization established on November 11, 2004 intended "to promote fellowship and camaraderie among Community Broadcasters united towards academic excellence, informative, entertaining and educational broadcasting and community service."
- The Linking Everyone Towards Service in College of Development Communication (LETS-CDC) - the premiere and autonomous college-based political party for the College of Development Communication. It believes in upholding the principles of Unity, Participatory Student Government, and Proactive Leadership. LETS CDC is a member of Bukluran UP System.
- The Graduate Students Association of DevCom (GradSADevCom) - an academic organization among graduate students studying at the college.

In 2022, the CDC established its own student newspaper called Tanglaw, making it the first college in UPLB to do so.

== Additional Sources ==
- Cadiz, Maria Celeste H. CFSC Pioneer: A Conversation With Nora Quebral https://web.archive.org/web/20070615173833/http://www.communicationforsocialchange.org/mazi-articles.php?id=294
- Brief reference from the FAO. http://www.fao.org/world/regional/rap/susdev_exten_comm_links.asp
- Adaptive Learning Linkages in Community Based Natural Resources Management (ALLinCBNRM) workshop website https://web.archive.org/web/20120210200024/http://www.allincbnrm.org/
- Asian Institute of Journalism and Communication (AIJC) Media Timeline https://web.archive.org/web/20090810203611/http://www.aijc.com.ph/PCCF/mediamuseum/timeline/timeline-post-war.htm
