= The Scarlet Letter (miniseries) =

1979 television series

- Written by: Nathaniel Hawthorne; Allan Knee; Alvin Sapinsley
- Directed by: Rick Hauser
- Starring: Josef Sommer; Meg Foster; Elisa Erali; John Heard; Kevin Conway
- Music by: John Morris
- Country of origin: United States
- Original language: English

Production
- Producers: Rick Hauser; Herbert Hirschman
- Cinematography: Bob Collins
- Editors: Ken Denisoff; Janet McFadden; Tucker Wiard
- Running time: 240 minutes (four 60 minute episodes)
- Production company: WGBH Boston

Original release
- Network: WGBH-TV
- Release: March 3 – March 24, 1979

The Scarlet Letter is a 1979 miniseries based on the 1850 novel of the same name by Nathaniel Hawthorne: it aired on WGBH from March 3, 1979 to March 24, 1979. The series is four episodes long, 60 minutes each. Part 2 won the 1979 Emmy Award for Outstanding Video Tape Editing for a Limited Series or Special for film editors Ken Denisoff, Janet McFadden and Tucker Wiard.

== Plot ==
Hester Prynne (Meg Foster) is a young Puritan woman who commits adultery while her husband is in Europe, and, upon the birth of her illegitimate child, is subsequently condemned to wear a scarlet "A" (for adultery) for the rest of her life. Her secret partner, the Reverend Arthur Dimmesdale (John Heard), writhes in private torment as he deals with hiding his sin. The person of Hester's husband, Roger Chillingworth (Kevin Conway), completes this grim triangle as the mysterious situation leads to a shattering climax. The story follows the main characters as they grapple with sin, forgiveness, and redemption.

== Production and broadcast ==
In 1979, when most literary programs were being produced in the United Kingdom, Boston public television station WGBH decided to produce a homegrown literary classic of its own. The production was funded by grants from the National Endowment for the Humanities, the Corporation for Public Broadcasting, the Andrew W. Mellon Foundation, the Arthur Vining Davis Foundation, and Exxon. It was made on videotape rather than film, for cost-saving, and many exterior scenes were shot at Sachuest Point, near Newport, Rhode Island. A behind-the-scenes documentary, The Making of the Scarlet Letter, was also made and broadcast in 1979.

== Cast ==
- Josef Sommer as Nathaniel Hawthorne
- Meg Foster as Hester Prynne
- Elisa Erali as Pearl Prynne
- John Heard as Reverend Arthur Dimmesdale
- Kevin Conway as Roger Chillingworth
- George Martin as Reverend Wilson

== Crew ==
- Directed by Rick Hauser
- Writing credits: Nathaniel Hawthorne, Allan Knee, and Alvin Sapinsley
- Produced by Rick Hauser and Herbert Hirschman
- Original music by John Morris
- Cinematography by Bob Collins
- Film editing by Ken Denisoff, Janet McFadden, and Tucker Wiard

== Reception ==
Critical response to The Scarlet Letter miniseries was mixed. Marvin Kitman conceded that it might be "heresy" to criticize such ambitious programming, but he faulted the first episode's pacing, saying "it moves like a gastropod" and "there is a lot of sewing going on." He found Foster's performance too repressed. Gannett's Maggie Maurice appreciated Foster's work; "If anyone can smoulder, it's Meg Foster." Because the production was expensive, no similar adaptions of American literary classics followed from WGBH; "It would be great if it was the first of many, but it's not likely," admitted director Rick Hauser.
