= Elizabeth Payne =

Elizabeth Payne may refer to:

- Elizabeth Payne, mother of Sir John Rogers, 1st Baronet
- Elizabeth Payne, mother of Albemarle Bertie, 9th Earl of Lindsey
- Elizabeth Payne, second wife of William Edmond
- Elizabeth Payne, wife of John Julius Angerstein
- Elizabeth Payne, third wife of Thomas Lucas
- Elizabeth Penn Payne, American actress who played Alexis Meade in the first season of US television series Ugly Betty
- Elizabeth Payne, variant spelling for Elizabeth Pain, settler in colonial Boston who may have partly inspired the character Hester Prynne in The Scarlet Letter
