= Joseph Kneeland =

American silversmiths

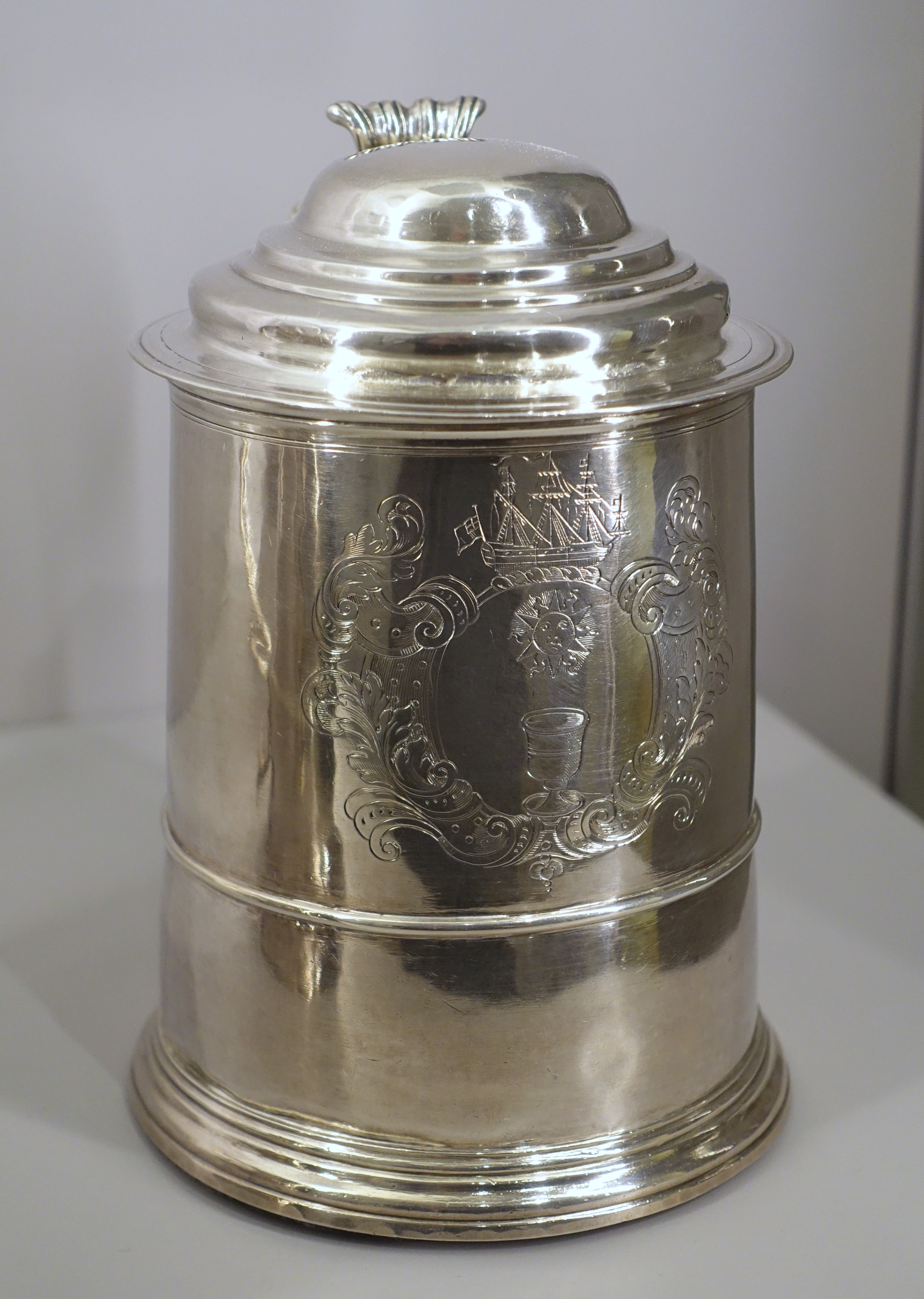
The John Vassal Tankard by Joseph Kneeland (1700-1740), c. 1729

Joseph Kneeland was the name of two silversmiths from the Thirteen Colonies, active in Boston in the early 1700s.

- Joseph Kneeland (December 14, 1700 – September 1740) was born in Boston, apprenticed about 1715 to John Dixwell, and married Mary Warton on February 6, 1728, with whom he had two sons and three daughters.
- Joseph Kneeland (July 20, 1698 – October 12, 1760) was also born in Boston, and married Elizabeth Chamberlain on November 8, 1722. He is buried in the King's Chapel Burying Ground, Boston.

Attribution of items between these two is inconsistent; the works of one or both are collected in the Harvard Art Museums and Museum of Fine Arts, Boston.
