= The Scarlet Letter (1934 film) =

1934 film by Robert G Vignola

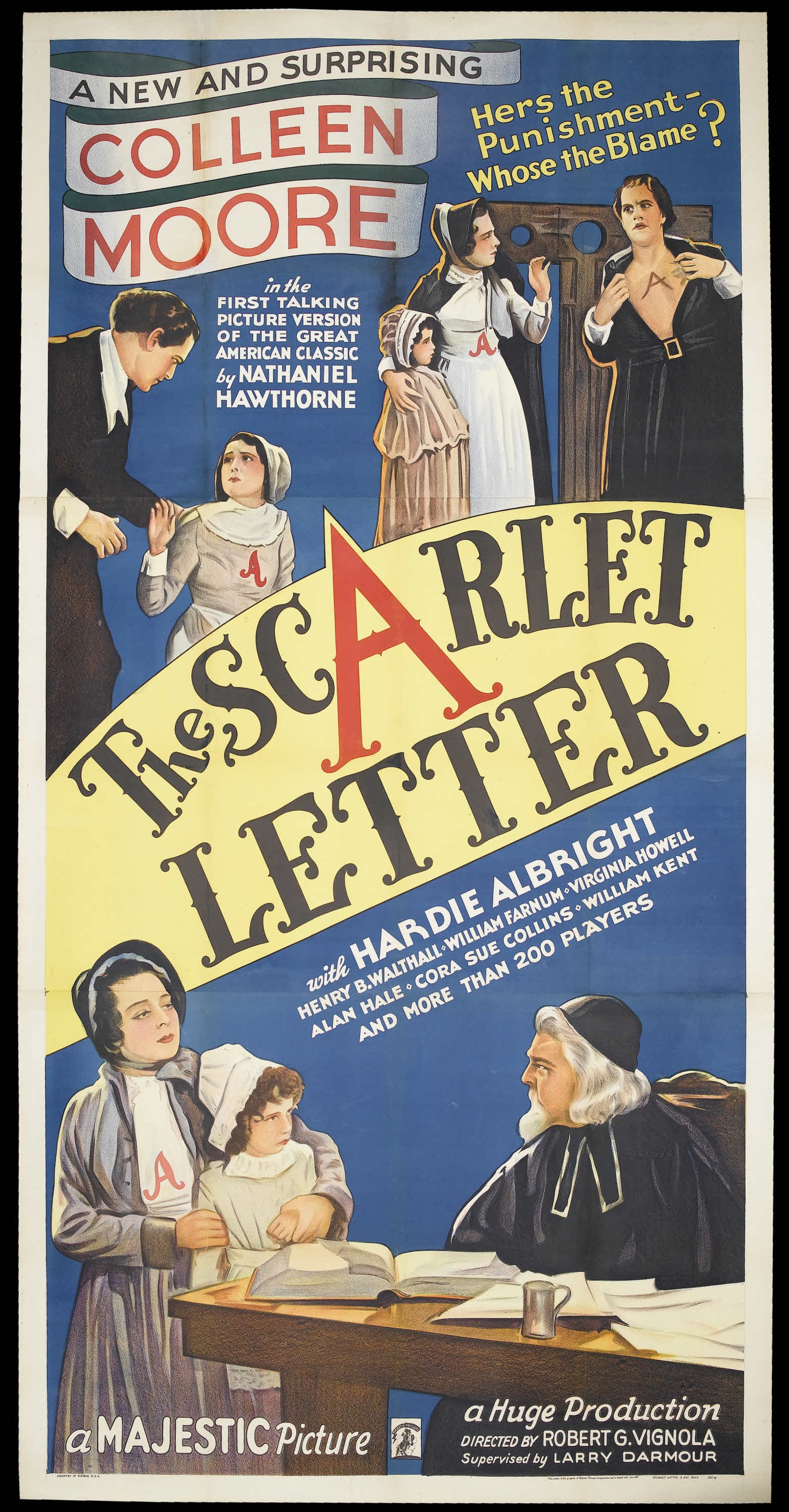
- Theatrical release three-sheet poster
- Directed by: Robert G. Vignola
- Written by: Leonard Fields; David Silverstein
- Based on: The Scarlet Letter; 1850 novel by Nathaniel Hawthorne
- Produced by: Larry Darmour
- Starring: Colleen Moore; Hardie Albright; Henry B. Walthall; Alan Hale
- Cinematography: James S. Brown Jr.
- Edited by: Charles Harris
- Music by: Abe Meyer
- Production company: Darmour Productions
- Distributed by: Majestic Pictures
- Release date: September 18, 1934
- Running time: 69 minutes
- Country: United States
- Language: English

The Scarlet Letter (1934)

The Scarlet Letter is a 1934 American film directed by Robert G. Vignola and based on the 1850 novel of the same name by Nathaniel Hawthorne.

The film has been preserved by the UCLA Film & Television Archive.

== Plot ==
Hester Prynne has a child out of wedlock and refuses to name the father (who is a respected citizen). For this, she is sentenced to wear a scarlet letter "A" (for adultery). Her husband is long missing and presumed lost at sea. When the husband returns and finds his wife with another man's child, he sets out to torture them. At last, the father of Hester's child reveals himself, with a letter "A" carved in his chest and dies after that.

== Cast ==
- Colleen Moore as Hester Prynne
- Hardie Albright as Arthur Dimmesdale
- Henry B. Walthall as Roger Chillingworth
- Cora Sue Collins as Pearl
- Alan Hale as Bartholomew Hockings
- Virginia Howell as Abigail Crakstone
- William Kent as Sampson Goodfellow
- William Farnum as Gov. Bellingham
- Betty Blythe as Innkeeper
- Al O. Henderson as Master Wilson
- Jules Cowles as Beadle
- Mickey Rentschler as Digerie Crakstone
- Shirley Jean Rickert as Humility Crakstone
- Flora Finch as Faith Bartle, the Gossip
- Tommy Bupp as Marching Boy (uncredited)
- Iron Eyes Cody as Native American (uncredited)

== Production ==
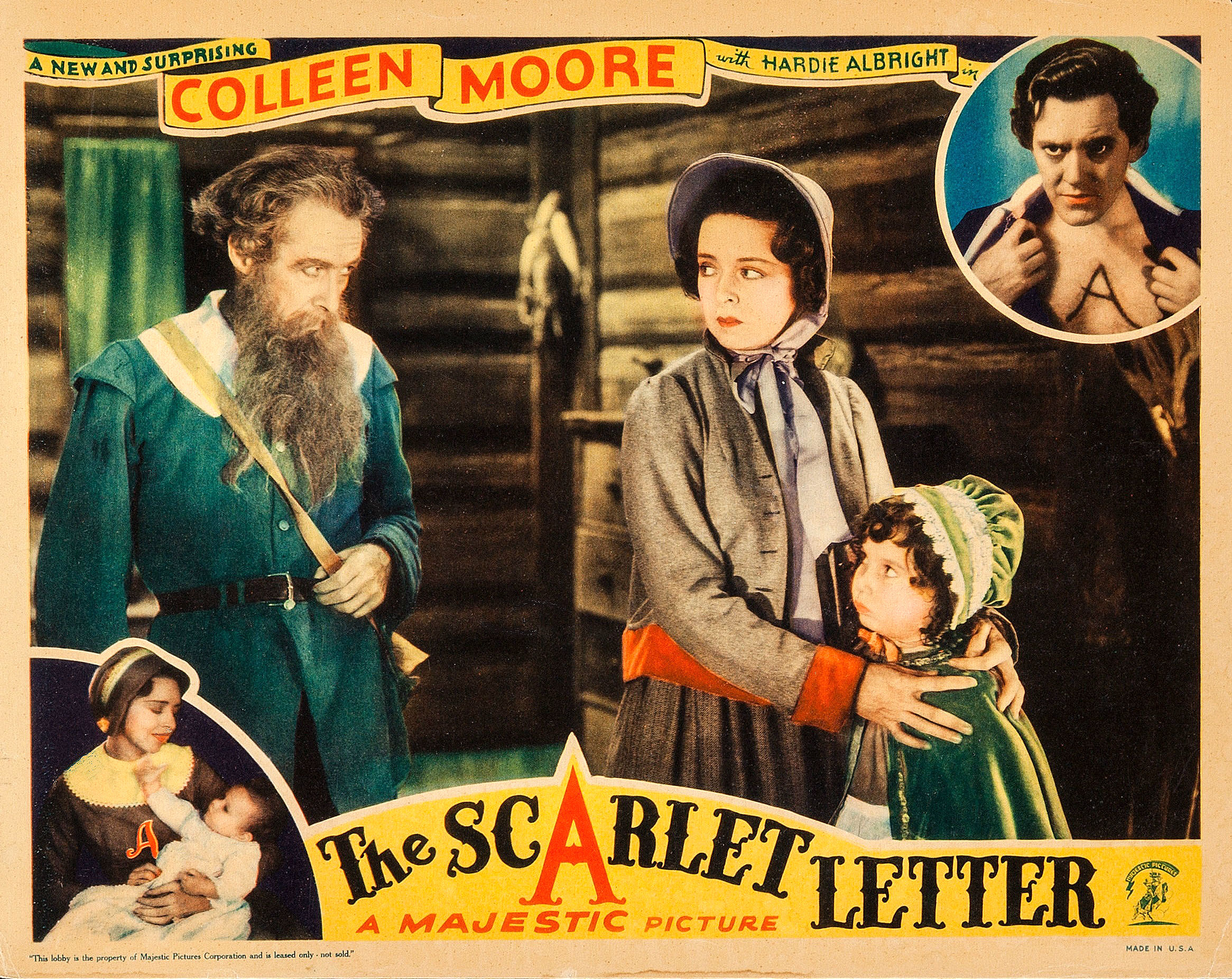
Lobby card for the film.

The first sound version of the story, starring former Jazz Age comedian Colleen Moore as the ill-fated Puritan adulteress, Hester Prynne, the film retained many of the silent film era players and studio sets from director Victor Seastrom’s 1926 silent adaptation starring Lillian Gish. Henry B. Walthall played Roger Chillingworth in both film versions.

Under the influence of the recently re-imposed Production Code, director Vignola emphasized the guilt-ridden ordeal of the novel’s protagonists, which resonated with Hollywood censor’s preference for a depiction of "the moral failure of the central figures" as a cautionary tale, to distinguish it from the Seastrom’s decidedly romantic film adaption.

It was shot in Sherman Oaks, California, and was the only film Colleen Moore ever said she made for the money. She was reportedly preparing to take her dollhouse on tour for charity, and saw the film as an opportunity to make a last film with friends.

== Reception ==
National Board of Review gave a negative review, criticizing the script and "Vignola's static, uninspired direction", but appreciated Moore's performance, considering it "the only good thing in the picture".
