= The Scarlet Letter =

1850 novel by Nathaniel Hawthorne

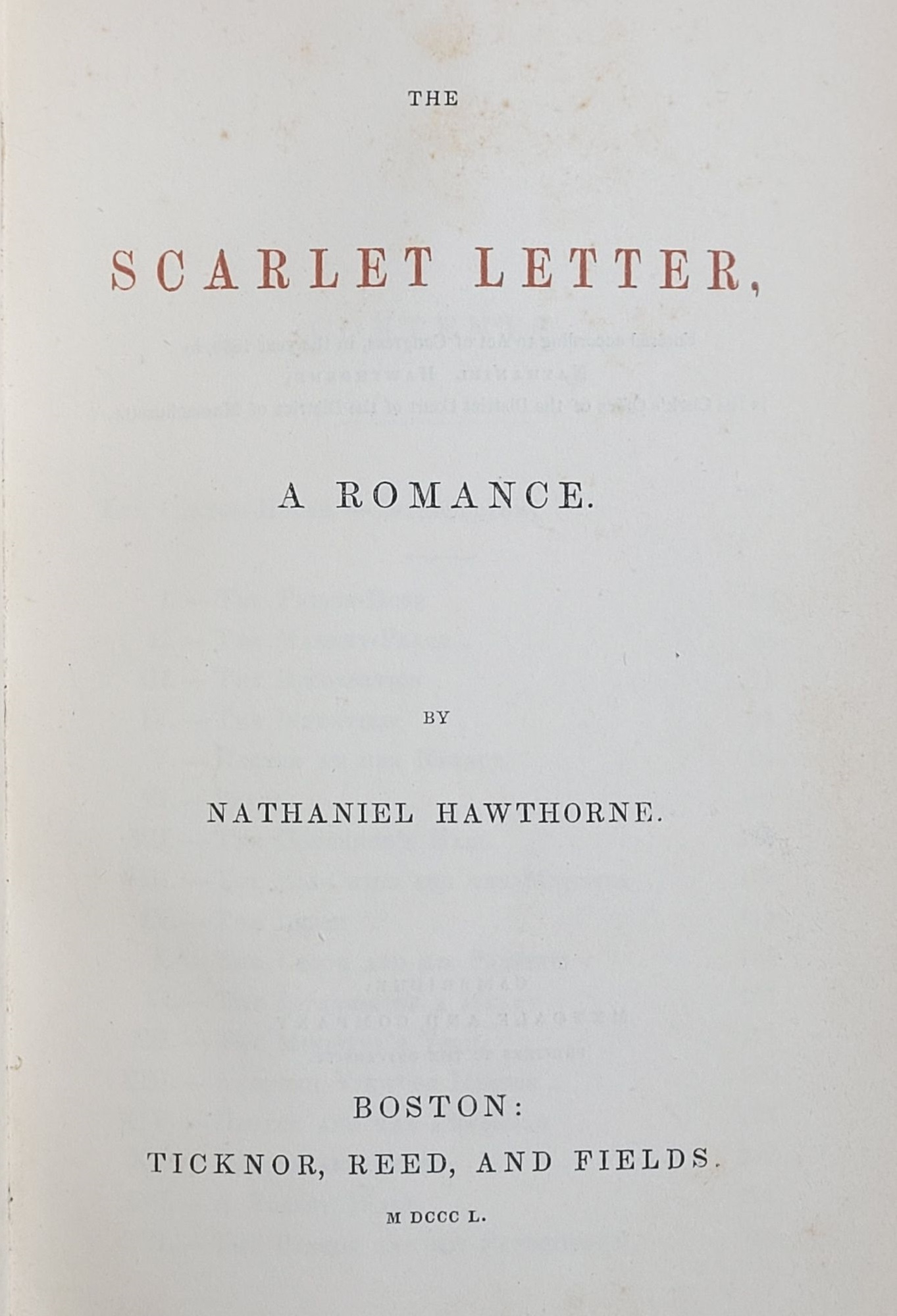
- Title page, first edition, 1850
- Author: Nathaniel Hawthorne
- Language: English
- Genre: Romantic, Historical
- Publisher: Ticknor, Reed & Fields
- Publication date: March 16, 1850
- Publication place: United States
- Dewey Decimal: 813.3
- Text: The Scarlet Letter at Wikisource

The Scarlet Letter: A Romance is a historical novel by American author Nathaniel Hawthorne, published in 1850. Set in the Puritan Massachusetts Bay Colony during the years 1642 to 1649, the novel tells the story of Hester Prynne, who conceives a daughter with a man to whom she is not married and then struggles to lead a new life of repentance and dignity. As punishment, she must wear a scarlet letter 'A' (for "adultery"). Containing a number of religious and historic allusions, the book explores themes of legalism, sin, and guilt.

The Scarlet Letter was one of the first mass-produced books in the United States. It was popular when first published and is considered a classic work of American literature. Commonly listed among the Great American Novels, it has inspired numerous film, television, and stage adaptations. Critics have described The Scarlet Letter as a masterwork, and novelist D. H. Lawrence called it a "perfect work of the American imagination".

== Plot ==
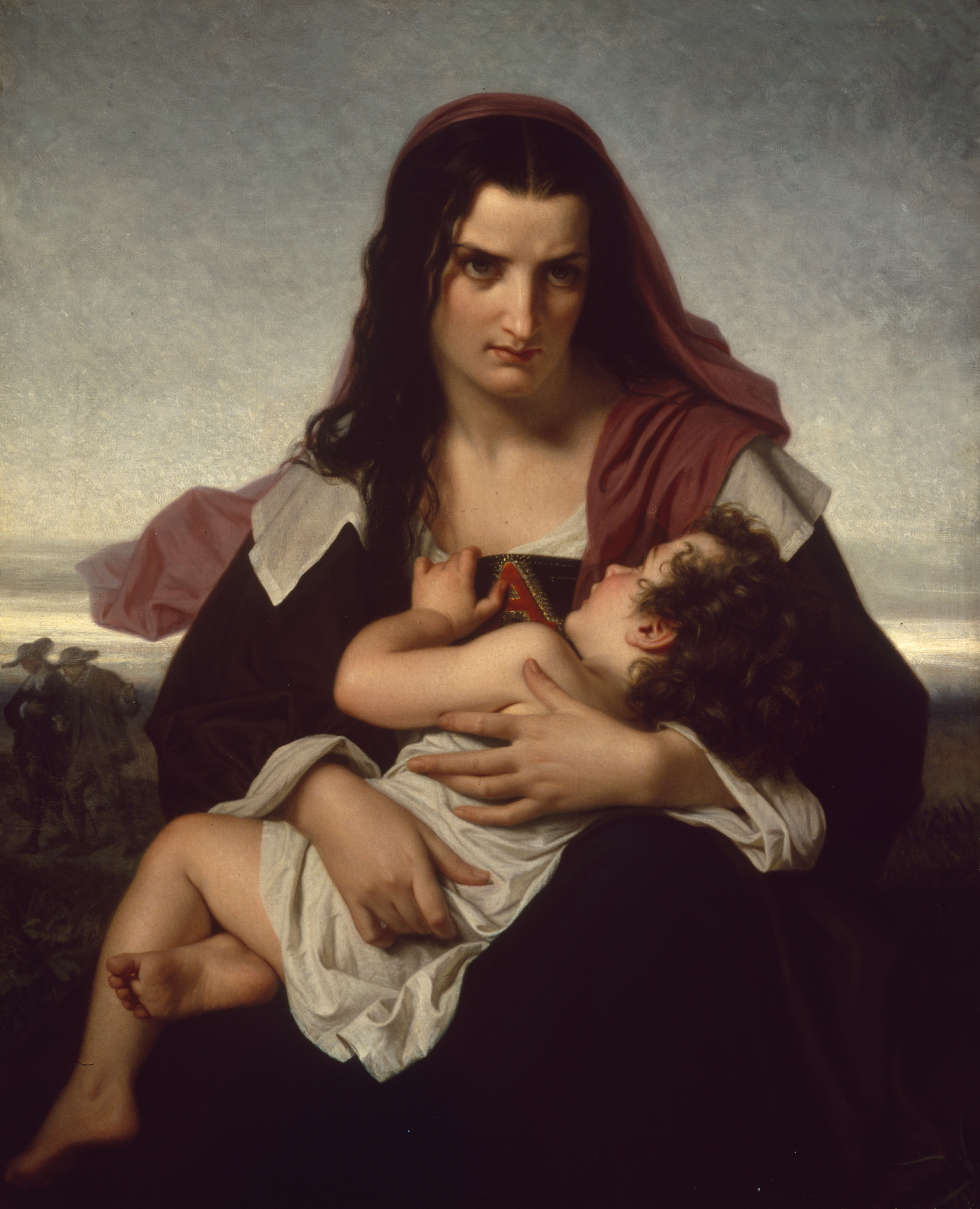
The Scarlet Letter by Hugues Merle (1861). Hester Prynne and Pearl in the foreground.

In Puritan Boston, Massachusetts, a crowd gathers to witness the punishment of Hester Prynne, a young woman who has given birth to a baby of unknown paternity. Her sentence requires her to stand on the scaffold of a former gallows for three hours, exposed to public humiliation, and to wear a scarlet "A" (representing adultery) for the rest of her life. As Hester approaches the scaffold, many women in the crowd are angered by her beauty and quiet dignity. When commanded to confess and name the father of her child, Hester refuses.

As Hester looks out over the crowd, she notices a small, misshapen man and recognizes him as her long-lost husband, who had been presumed lost at sea. The husband and wife had intended to move to the New World. He had sent Hester ahead, intending to join her after finishing some business. When Hester's husband sees Hester being shamed on the scaffold for committing adultery, he asks a man in the crowd about her and is told the story of his wife's pregnancy. He angrily exclaims that the child's father should also be punished for his immoral act and vows to find the man. He chooses a new name, Roger Chillingworth, to aid him in his plan.

The Reverend John Wilson and the minister of Hester's church, Arthur Dimmesdale, question her, but she refuses to name her lover. After she returns to her prison cell, the jailer brings in Chillingworth, now a physician, to calm Hester and her child with his roots and herbs. He and Hester have an open conversation regarding their marriage and the fact that they were both in the wrong. Chillingworth demands to know who fathered Hester's child, but Hester refuses to divulge that information. He accepts Hester's refusal, stating that he will find out the man's identity anyway. Chillingworth threatens to destroy the father of Hester's child if Hester ever reveals that Chillingworth is her husband. Hester agrees to Chillingworth's terms, although she suspects she will regret it.

Following her release from prison, Hester settles in a cottage at the edge of town and earns a meager living with her needlework, which is of extraordinary quality. She lives a quiet, somber life with her daughter, Pearl, and performs acts of charity for the poor. She is troubled by her daughter's unusual fascination with the scarlet "A". The shunning of Hester also extends to Pearl, who has no playmates or friends. As she grows older, Pearl becomes capricious and unruly. Her conduct sparks controversy, and the church members suggest Pearl be taken away from Hester. Hester, hearing that she may lose Pearl, goes to speak to Governor Bellingham and ministers Wilson and Dimmesdale. Hester appeals to Dimmesdale in desperation, and the minister persuades the governor to let Pearl remain in Hester's care.

Because Dimmesdale's health has begun to fail, the townspeople are happy to have Chillingworth, the newly arrived physician, take up lodgings with their beloved minister. In close contact with Dimmesdale, Chillingworth suspects that the minister's illness is the result of unconfessed guilt. He applies psychological pressure to the minister because he suspects Dimmesdale is Pearl's father. One evening, pulling the sleeping Dimmesdale's vestment aside, Chillingworth sees a symbol that represents his shame on the minister's pale chest.

Tormented by his guilty conscience, Dimmesdale goes to the square where Hester was punished years earlier. Climbing the scaffold in the dead of night, he admits his guilt but cannot find the courage to do so publicly in the light of day. Hester, shocked by Dimmesdale's deterioration, decides to obtain a release from her vow of silence to her husband.

Hester meets Dimmesdale in the forest and tells him of her husband and his desire for revenge. She convinces Dimmesdale to leave Boston in secret on a ship to Europe where they can start life anew. Inspired by this plan, the minister seems to gain energy.

On Election Day, Dimmesdale gives one of his most inspired sermons. As the procession leaves the church, however, Dimmesdale climbs upon the scaffold, confesses his sin, and dies in Hester's arms. Later, most witnesses swear that they saw a stigma in the form of a scarlet "A" upon his chest, although some deny this statement. Chillingworth loses his vengeance and dies within a year, leaving Pearl a substantial inheritance both in New England and in Europe; Hester and Pearl leave for Europe shortly thereafter.

After several years, Hester returns to her cottage without Pearl and resumes wearing the scarlet letter. When she dies, she is buried near Dimmesdale's grave, and they share a simple slate tombstone engraved with an epitaph described as: "On a field, sable, the letter A, gules" ("On a black background, the letter A in red").

== Themes ==
Elmer Kennedy-Andrews remarks that Hawthorne in "The Customhouse" sets the context for his story and "tells us about 'romance', which is his preferred generic term to describe The Scarlet Letter, as his subtitle for the book– 'A Romance'– would indicate." In this introduction, Hawthorne describes a space between materialism and "dreaminess" that he calls "a neutral territory, somewhere between the real world and fairyland, where the Actual and the Imaginary may meet, and each imbues itself with nature of the other". This combination of "dreaminess" and realism gave the author space to explore major themes.

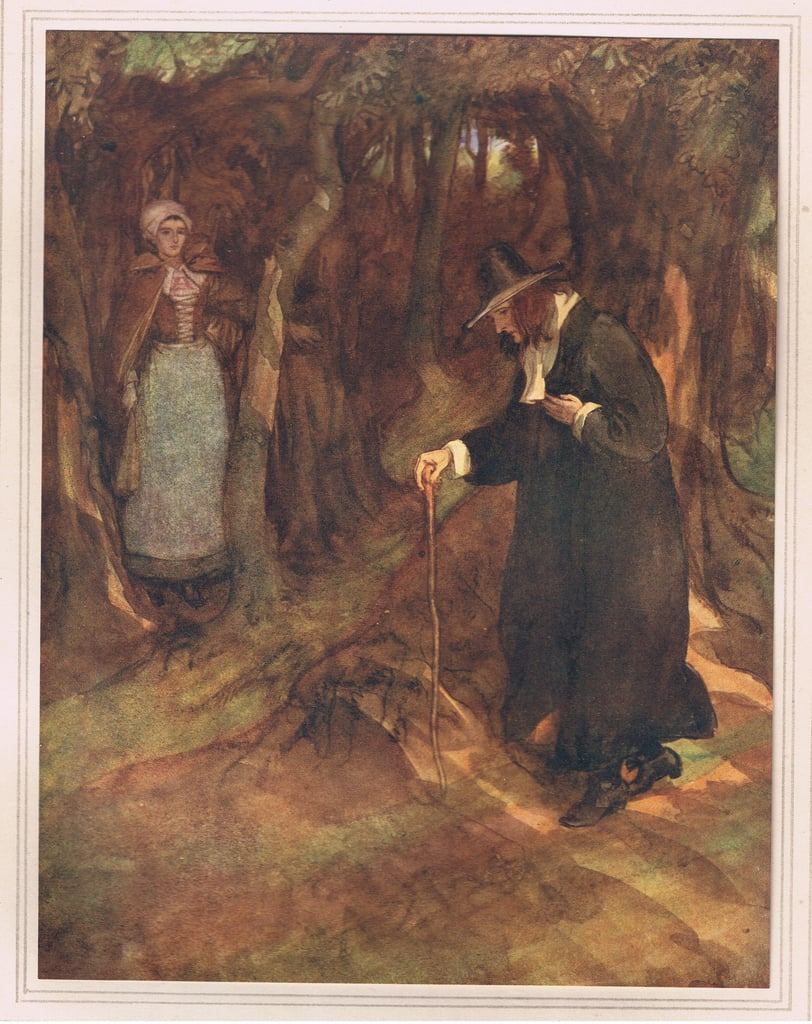
She beheld the minister advancing, illustrated by Hugh Thomson from a 1920 edition

The experience of Prynne and Dimmesdale recalls the story of Adam and Eve because, in both cases, sin results in expulsion and suffering. But it also results in knowledge – specifically, of 'what it means to be immoral'. For Prynne, the Scarlet Letter is a physical manifestation of her 'sin' and a reminder of her painful solitude. She contemplates casting it off to obtain her freedom from an oppressive society and a checkered past, as well as the absence of God. Because the society excludes her, she considers the possibility that many of the traditions upheld by the Puritan culture are untrue and not designed to bring her happiness.

Andrew Barger submits that in The Scarlet Letter Hawthorne, via Puritanical allegory, portrays the aftermath of the rumored affair between Edgar Allan Poe and Frances Osgood, with Poe as Minister Dimmesdale and Osgood as Hester Prynne. Dimmesdale, the "cheating minister" "his sin gives him sympathies so intimate with the sinful brotherhood of mankind" "that his chest vibrate[s] in unison with theirs." His eloquent and powerful sermons derive from this sense of empathy., according to Edward Davidson (1963), an Episcopalian Christian and Calvinist literary scholar, his "fall is a descent from apparent grace to his own damnation; he appears to begin in purity, but ends in corruption". "The subtlety is that the minister is his own deceiver (...) convincing himself at every stage of his spiritual pilgrimage that he is saved".

Throughout the work, the nature images contrast with the stark darkness of the Puritans and their systems. A rose bush's beauty forms a striking contrast to all that surrounds it. Later, the beautifully embroidered scarlet "A" is held out in part as an invitation to find "some sweet moral blossom" in the ensuing, tragic tale and in part as an image that "the deep heart of nature" (perhaps God) may look kindlier on the errant Prynne and her child than her Puritan neighbors do.

Chillingworth's misshapen body reflects (or symbolizes) the anger in his soul, just as Dimmesdale's illness reveals his inner turmoil. The outward man reflects the condition of the heart. This observation is thought to have been inspired by the deterioration of Edgar Allan Poe, whom Hawthorne admired.

Another theme is the extreme legalism of the Puritans and how Prynne chose not to conform to their rules and beliefs. Prynne was rejected by the villagers even though she spent her life doing what she could to help the sick and the poor. Because she was shunned, she spent her life mostly in solitude and did not attend church. Instead, she retreated into her own mind. Her thoughts began to stretch beyond what would be considered by the Puritans as safe. She still saw her 'sin', but she began to look at it differently than the villagers did. Prynne began to believe that a person's earthly sins do not necessarily condemn them, as the villagers seemed to, even telling Dimmesdale specifically that their sin had been paid for by their daily penance and that their sin would not prevent them from reaching heaven.

== Publication history ==
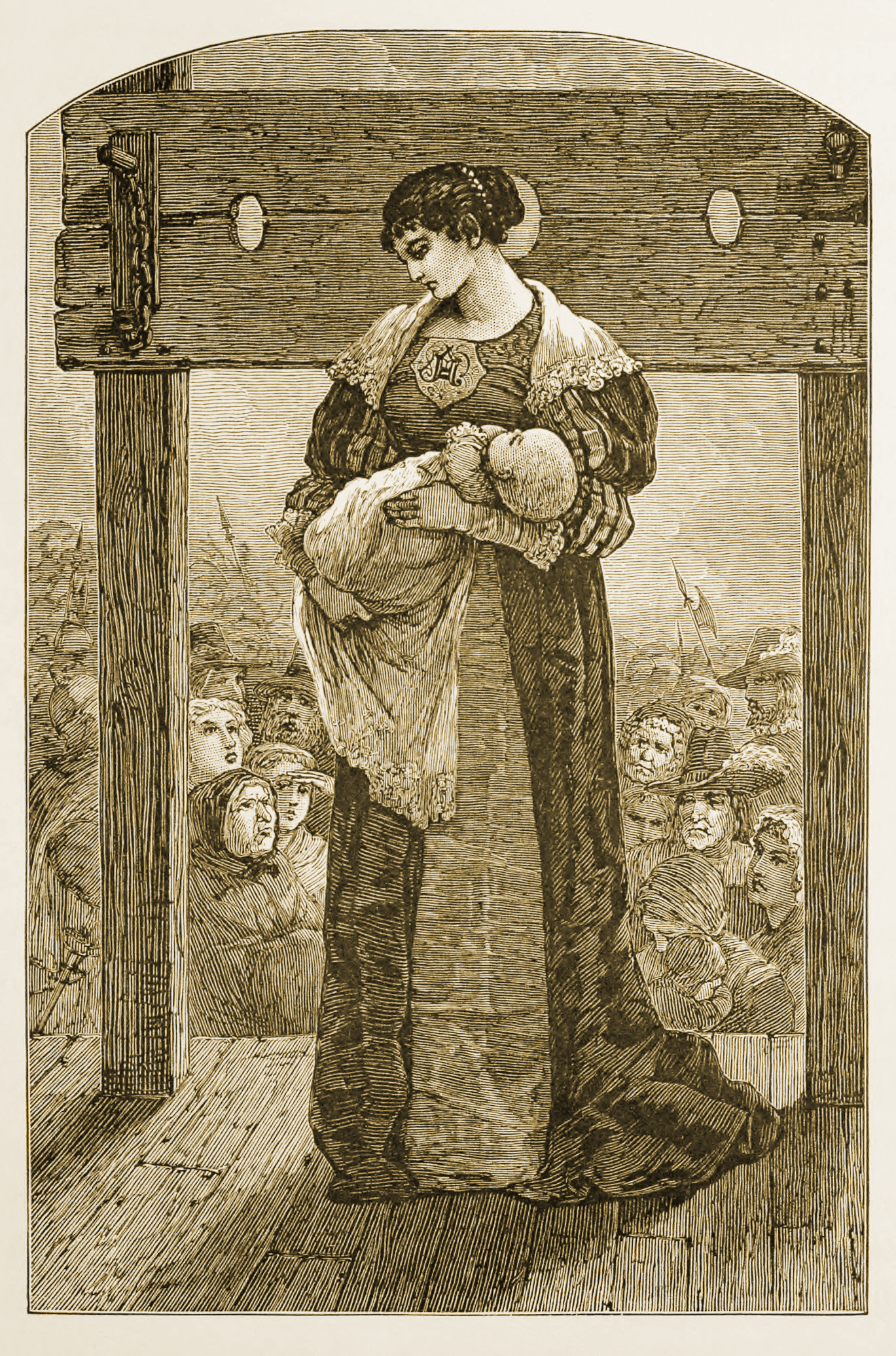
Hester Prynne at the pillory, an engraved illustration from an 1878 edition

The Scarlet Letter was first published in the spring of 1850 by Ticknor and Fields, beginning Hawthorne's most lucrative period. When he delivered the final pages to Fields in February 1850, Hawthorne said that "some portions of the book are powerfully written" but doubted it would be popular. In fact, the book was an instant best-seller, though, over fourteen years, it brought its author only $1,500. Its initial publication brought wide protest from natives of Salem, who did not approve of how Hawthorne had depicted them in his introduction "The Custom-House". A 2,500-copy second edition included a preface by Hawthorne dated March 30, 1850, that stated he had decided to reprint his Introduction "without the change of a word... The only remarkable features of the sketch are its frank and genuine good humor... As to enmity, or ill-feeling of any kind, personal or political, he utterly disclaims such motives".

Hawthorne wrote the manuscript at the Peter Edgerley House in Salem, Massachusetts, still standing as a private residence at 14 Mall Street. It was the last Salem home where the Hawthorne family lived.

The Scarlet Letter was also one of the first mass-produced books in America. In the mid-nineteenth century, bookbinders of home-grown literature typically hand-made their books and sold them in small quantities. The first mechanized printing of The Scarlet Letter, 2,500 volumes, sold out within ten days.

It was long held that Hawthorne originally planned The Scarlet Letter to be a shorter novelette, part of a collection named Old Time Legends, and that his publisher, James T. Fields, convinced him to expand the work to a full-length novel. This is not true: Fields persuaded Hawthorne to publish The Scarlet Letter alone (along with the earlier-completed "Custom House" essay) but he had nothing to do with the length of the story. Hawthorne's wife Sophia later challenged Fields' claims a little inexactly: "he has made the absurd boast that he was the sole cause of the Scarlet Letter being published!" She noted that her husband's friend Edwin Percy Whipple, a critic, approached Fields to consider its publication.

A signed first edition, first printing of Scarlet Letter from March 1850 published by Ticknor, Reed and Fields sold for $22,500. Unsigned, the retail price was estimated in 2014 at $12,500.

== Critical response ==
On its publication, critic Evert Augustus Duyckinck, a friend of Hawthorne's, said he preferred the author's Washington Irving-like tales. Another friend, critic Edwin Percy Whipple, objected to the novel's "morbid intensity" with dense psychological details, writing that the book "is therefore apt to become, like Hawthorne, too painfully anatomical in his exhibition of them". English writer Mary Anne Evans writing as "George Eliot", called The Scarlet Letter, along with Henry Wadsworth Longfellow's 1855 book-length poem The Song of Hiawatha, the "two most indigenous and masterly productions in American literature". Most literary critics praised the book but religious leaders took issue with the novel's subject matter. Orestes Brownson complained that Hawthorne did not understand Christianity, confession, and remorse. A review in The Church Review and Ecclesiastical Register concluded the author "perpetrates bad morals."

On the other hand, 20th century writer D. H. Lawrence said that there could not be a more perfect work of the American imagination than The Scarlet Letter. Henry James once said of the novel, "It is beautiful, admirable, extraordinary; it has in the highest degree that merit which I have spoken of as the mark of Hawthorne's best things—an indefinable purity and lightness of conception...One can often return to it; it supports familiarity and has the inexhaustible charm and mystery of great works of art."

== Allusions ==
The following historical and Biblical references appear in The Scarlet Letter.

- Anne Hutchinson, mentioned in Chapter 1, "The Prison Door", was a religious dissenter (1591–1643). In the 1630s she was excommunicated by the Puritans and exiled from Boston, and moved to Rhode Island.
- Ann Hibbins, who historically was executed for witchcraft in Boston in 1656, is depicted in The Scarlet Letter as a witch who tries to tempt Prynne to the practice of witchcraft.
- Richard Bellingham (c. 1592–1672), who historically was the governor of Massachusetts and deputy governor at the time of Hibbins's execution, was depicted in The Scarlet Letter as the brother of Ann Hibbins.
- Martin Luther (1483–1546) was a leader of the Protestant Reformation in Germany.
- Increase Mather (1639–1723), a powerful leader of the early Massachusetts Bay Colony. He was a Puritan minister involved with the government of the colony, and also the Salem Witch Trials.
- Sir Thomas Overbury and Dr. Forman were the subjects of an adultery scandal in 1615 in England. Dr. Forman was charged with trying to poison his adulterous wife and her lover. Overbury was a friend of the lover and was perhaps poisoned.
- John Winthrop (1588–1649), second governor of the Massachusetts Bay Colony.
- King's Chapel Burying Ground, mentioned in the final paragraph, exists; the Elizabeth Pain gravestone is traditionally considered an inspiration for the protagonists' grave.
- The story of King David and Bathsheba is depicted in the tapestry in Mr. Dimmesdale's room (chapter 9). (See II Samuel 11–12 for the Biblical story.)
- John Eliot (c. 1604–1690) was a Puritan missionary to the American Indians whom some called "the apostle to the Indians". He is referred to as "the Apostle Eliot" whom Dimmesdale has gone to visit at the beginning of Chapter 16, "A Forest Walk".

== Symbols ==
The following are symbols that are embedded in The Scarlet Letter:

- The Scarlet Letter "A": In the beginning of the novel, Hester's letter "A" is a representation of her sin and adultery. However, as time progresses, the meaning of the letter changed. To some, it now meant "able". The novel states, "The letter was the symbol of her calling. Such helpfulness was found in her—so much power to do, and power to sympathize—that many people refused to interpret the scarlet A by its original signification. They said that it meant Able, so strong was Hester Prynne, with a woman's strength".
- Meteor: The meteor shaped as an A serves as another symbol in the book. To Reverend Dimmesdale, the meteor is a sign from God. God is revealing Dimmesdale's sin to everyone, and Dimmesdale is ridden with guilt. However, others perceived the letter to be the symbol of an angel.
- Dimmesdale's name: Dimmesdale's name itself also holds symbolism. His name contains the root word "dim", which evokes faintness, weakness, and gloom, and represents Dimmesdale's constant state since the commission of his sin.
- Pearl: Pearl is the embodiment of her parents' sin and passion. She is a constant reminder of the sin from which her mother cannot escape. It is mentioned she "was the scarlet letter in another form; the scarlet letter endowed in life".
- Rosebush: The rosebush is mentioned twice within the course of the story. It is first viewed as nature's way of offering beauty to those who leave and enter the prison, as well as providing a glimmer of hope to those who inhabit it. The rosebush is perceived as a symbol of brightness in a story filled with human sorrow.
- The Scaffold: The scaffold is mentioned three times throughout the novel. It can be viewed as separating the book into its beginning, middle, and end. It symbolizes shame, revelation of sin, and guilt, for it is the location where Hester received her scarlet letter as punishment and where Dimmesdale experienced his revelation through the meteor.

== Adaptations and influence ==
The Scarlet Letter has inspired numerous film, television, and stage adaptations, and plot elements have influenced several novels, musical works, and screen productions.

=== Stage ===
The Scarlet Letter appeared as a stage play as early as February 24, 1858, when an adaptation by George L. Aiken opened at Barnum's American Museum. George C. Howard and his wife starred as Dimmesdale and Hester, respectively.

Walter Damrosch in 1896 premiered an opera, The Scarlet Letter. Twentieth century American composer Marjorie Rusche's opera The Scarlet Letter is based on Hawthorne's work.

Playwright Suzan-Lori Parks adapted elements of the novel into her "Red Letter Plays" series, consisting of "In the Blood (1999) and "Fucking A" (2000) both of which reimagine Hester Prynee in modern settings.

=== Film ===
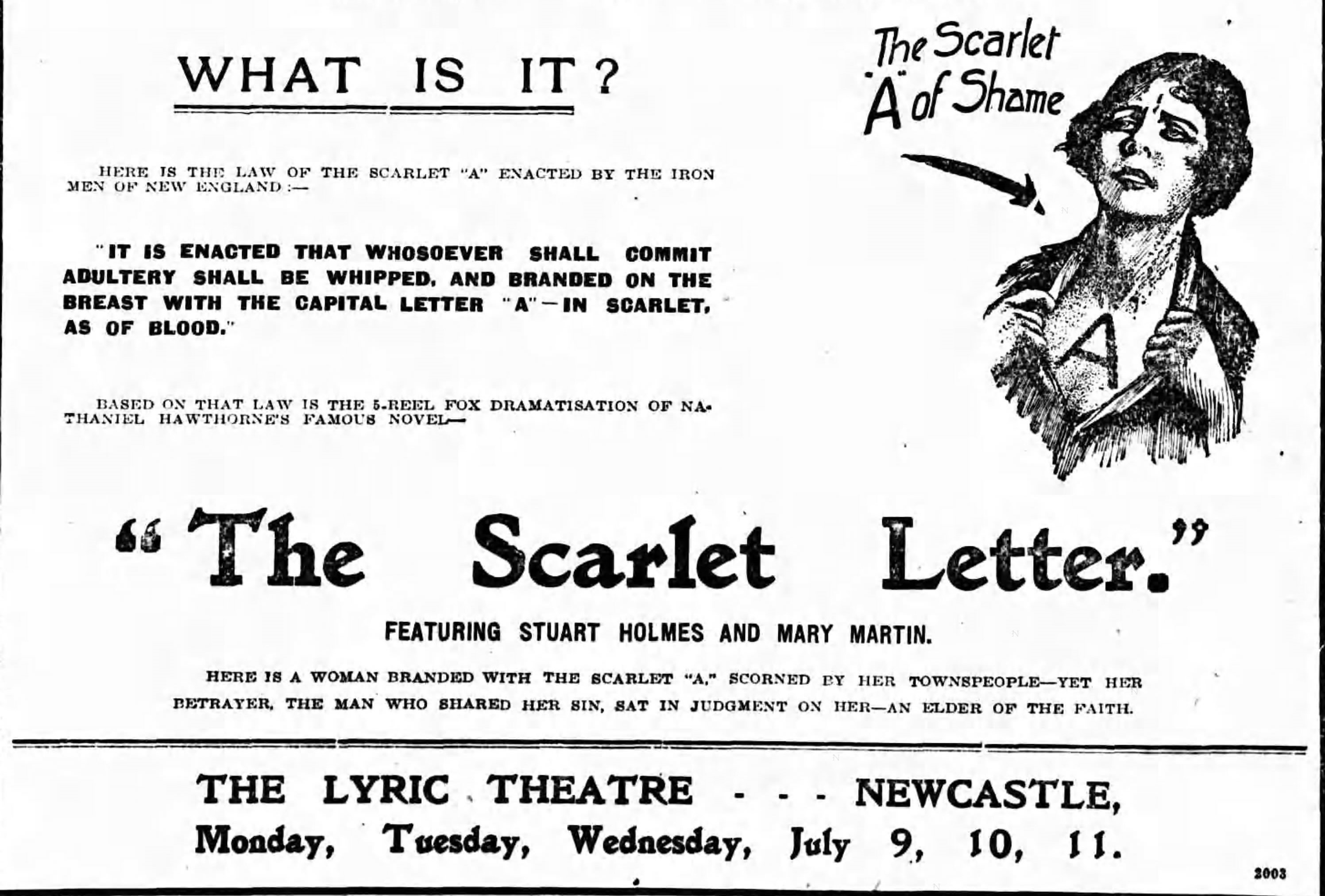
Advertisement for 1917 adaptation of The Scarlet Letter

The story has been adapted to film multiple times, typically using the same title as the novel. The first film adaptation was a 1908 short film. This lost silent film was directed by Sidney Olcott from a screenplay by Gene Gauntier, who also starred as Hester. The oldest surviving film adaptation is The Scarlet Letter (1911 film) directed by Joseph W. Smiley and George Loane Tucker, with Lucille Young as Hester and King Baggot as Dimmesdale. Subsequent film adaptations were made in 1926 (dir. Victor Sjöström), 1934 (dir. Robert G. Vignola), 1973 (dir. Wim Wenders), and 1995 (dir. by Roland Joffé and starring Demi Moore). A television miniseries was made in 1979. The novel also partially inspired Easy A (dir. by Will Gluck) from a screenplay by Bert V. Royal and starring Emma Stone.

=== Ballet ===
Dianna Cuatto created a one-act ballet adaptation of The Scarlet Letter with music by Samuel Barber as part of her Master's Thesis from the University of Utah. She revived the work in 2012 with the Ballet Theatre of Maryland, during her tenure as artistic director.

=== Literary sequels ===
John Updike rewrote The Scarlet Letter in his The Scarlet Letter trilogy S., A Month of Sundays and Roger's Version.

== See also ==
- Badge of shame
- Boston in fiction
- Colonial history of the United States
- Illegitimacy in fiction
- Whore of Babylon
- Angel and Apostle, a 2005 novel about the same characters
