= William T. Kent =

American actor

- Born: William Thomas Kent; April 29, 1886; St. Paul, Minnesota, U.S.
- Died: October 5, 1945 (aged 59); New York City, New York, U.S.
- Other name: Billy Kent
- Occupation: Actor
- Years active: 1906 (Broadway debut) to 1934

William Thomas Kent (April 29, 1886 - October 5, 1945) was an American stage actor who later appeared in sound films.

Kent was born in St. Paul, Minnesota. His initial employment with entertainment occurred during a summer vacation. He left his family and returned to St. Paul, where the manager of a stock company gave him a job.

Kent's career traversed many forms of entertainment (i.e. Broadway, vaudeville, burlesque, minstrel (at age 14), circus, and silent and sound films). Between 1918 and 1935, he appeared in thirteen Broadway shows, including two Gershwin musicals, Funny Face (1927) and Girl Crazy (1930). In 1922, he appeared with Marion Davies in the silent When Knighthood Was in Flower. He turned up in The Scarlet Letter (1934).

Kent died in New York City on October 5, 1945.

== Filmography ==
- When Knighthood Was in Flower (1922)
- Wall Tell Tales (1928, short film)
- King of Jazz (1930)
- Saturday's Millions (1933)
- The Scarlet Letter (1934)
