= The Wind (1986 film) =

- Promotional poster
- Directed by: Nico Mastorakis
- Screenplay by: Nico Mastorakis; Fred Perry
- Produced by: Nico Mastorakis
- Starring: Meg Foster; Wings Hauser; Robert Morley
- Cinematography: Andreas Bellis
- Edited by: Bruce Cannon; Nico Mastorakis
- Music by: Hans Zimmer; Stanley Myers
- Production company: Omega Pictures
- Distributed by: DPI Propaganda
- Release date: November 17, 1986
- Running time: 92 minutes
- Countries: United States; Greece
- Language: English

The Wind (also known as The Edge of Terror and Terror's Edge) is a 1986 slasher film co-written, produced, co-edited and directed by Nico Mastorakis. It stars Meg Foster, Wings Hauser, Robert Morley, and David McCallum. The film follows a novelist who is under attack by an assailant during a windy night in Monemvasia. An international co-production between the United States and Greece.

== Plot ==
American novelist Sian Anderson travels to the solitude of Greek island Monemvasia from her Los Angeles home to write her newest mystery book. She rents a home owned by Elias Appelby, an eccentric elderly man, who advises her that a strong and massive wind will occur throughout the night, and that he recommends she stay indoors while the wind blows from the sea. After Elias leaves, Sian is met by Phil, a gruff handyman and fellow American who also lives on the property.

That night, Phil murders Elias after he attempts to fire him. Sian later witnesses Phil burying something from a distance. When she goes to investigate, she finds Elias's corpse. Terrified, she phones her boyfriend, John, back in Los Angeles, and asks him to report the crime, as she does not know the emergency number in Greece. She also tries to call Elias's wife, whose phone number she locates, but is unable to communicate with her as she does not speak English. Phil, realizing that Sian knows what happened, breaks into the house through the basement. Armed with a sickle, Phil attempts to attack Sian, but Sian thwarts him by closing the basement hatch and pouring kerosene on him. In the basement, Phil taunts Sian by toying with the generator, causing the lights to go on and off.

Hiding in an upstairs room of the home, Sian later hears Elias's wife arrive at the house, calling out for her husband. As she wanders toward the entry, Phil stabs her to death. Sian manages to phone John again, who tells her he has two operators attempting to reach Greek authorities. Soon after, the local police station on Monemvasia receives a call about a woman in distress at the Appleby estate. Kesner, an American marine captain stranded on the island due to the weather, offers to go help Sian, who has locked herself in the house. She allows him in and is momentarily at ease, until Kesner is murdered by Phil, who has infiltrated the house. Sian discovers Kesner stabbed to death in an upstairs bedroom, along with the corpses of Elias and his wife stuffed inside a closet.

Cornered and helpless, Sian recalls that Elias had mentioned several locked closets in the home, which he used to store his son's hunting weapons, and had requested she leave them unbothered. Sian locates the closets and breaks into them, arming herself with a rifle. She begins to shoot at Phil from a second-story window, as he raves maniacally below. Phil then proceeds to scale a wall, reaching a balcony on the second story of the home, where Sian has created a booby trap on one of the door shutters by pulling it against the wind current with a piece of rope; as Phil approaches her, she slashes the rope with a knife, forcing the door to swing out and strike Phil, causing him to impale himself on his sickle before falling to the ground below.

Presuming Phil dead, Sian flees the house, stumbling through stone pathways toward the villa. In a corridor, the ground gives out and she falls into a cavern beneath the street, where she finds a man's skeleton. At dawn, Sian finds a way out of the caverns, and ends up on a rock wall along the coast, where she sees a young honeymooning couple driving down the road. She calls out to them, but they do not hear her. She is then met by Phil, who survived his earlier fall. He begins chasing Sian, who flees through the winding cliffside pathways. Phil eventually corners Sian and attempts to strike her with the sickle, but a gust of wind forces him to lose his footing, and he falls to his death.

== Cast ==
- Meg Foster as Sian Anderson
- Wings Hauser as Phil
- David McCallum as John
- Robert Morley as Elias Appleby
- Steve Railsback as Kesner
- Summer Thomas as Sian's Friend
- Dina Giannakou as Elias' Wife
- Mihalis Giannatos as Policeman
- John Michaels and Tracy Young as Newlyweds

== Release ==
The Wind was released on VHS in the United States by Lightning Video in 1987, and by PolyGram Video in the United Kingdom as The Edge of Terror. Simitar Entertainment released the film on DVD on June 29, 1999, with Image Entertainment later releasing the film on March 25, 2003. On January 31, 2020, Arrow Video announced that they will be issuing The Wind on Blu-ray, which was released on April 14.
