= Angel and Apostle =

2005 novel by Deborah Noyes

- Author: Deborah Noyes
- Language: English
- Genre: Historical novel
- Publisher: Unbridled Books
- Publication date: 25 October 2005
- Publication place: United States
- Media type: Print (hardback & paperback)
- Pages: 304 pp (first edition, hardback)
- ISBN: 1-932961-10-0 (first edition, hardback)
- OCLC: 60697029
- LC Class: PZ7.N96157 Ang 2005
- Preceded by: The Scarlet Letter

Angel and Apostle is a novel written by Deborah Noyes and published in 2005. It is often viewed as a sequel to The Scarlet Letter, a novel by American author Nathaniel Hawthorne, but it is more like a companion due to the overlap of events between the novels.

== Plot summary ==
The story begins with Hester and Pearl in their cabin in the woods. Hester has little discipline for her child, and Pearl runs wild and free most of the time doing as little work as possible. Pearl frequently visits a blind boy named Simon who lives in a house nearby. They become friends, and Hester lets Pearl help Liza, the caretaker of Simon's sickly mother, with the chores around Simon's house. However, Pearl has been stigmatized as the child of "the temptress," and this reputation follows her everywhere. She isn't fazed by this until Simon begins repeating things his older brother said about Hester. Upset, Pearl runs away to the graveyard to visit the grave of Simon's mother who died shortly after Pearl started helping out around the house. She talks to the minister until Doctor Devlin comes. Pearl returns to Hester, who tells her that the doctor is a "devil." One night Governor Winthrop lies dying, and Hester is called to tend to him. Pearl runs away from the Governor's mansion, and finds Devlin standing on the scaffold. He invites Pearl up until the minister, Arthur, comes and takes Devlin away.

Pearl grows closer to Simon, and Nehemiah, Simon's only brother, gives his blessing to the friendship when he lets Pearl take Simon to the beach. However, Pearl learns that Simon and his family are returning to London, and Hester and she are moving to the Netherlands to be with her mother's relatives. Pearl was supposed to leave the night of Election Day, but instead Arthur the minister collapses and eventually dies. Hester is blamed and put in the stocks, preventing any escape by sea. Devlin comes to taunt Hester for what she has done, even asking her if the minister fathered her child because of her reaction to his death. Hester remains defiant and doesn't give in to him. However, she falls extremely depressed when she arrives home, and Pearl is forced to bring Simon's father Caleb Milton and Doctor Devlin to help Hester. Hester agrees to travel on the Milton's boat to England, and also agrees to a seven-year work contract with Milton's sister.

Hester and Pearl work with Milton's sister until Pearl turns 18. Pearl learns that Devlin gave her property in England and New England. She sells the English property and purchases a home in the English countryside, where Nehemiah and she get married. Pearl and Nehemiah argue about Simon's welfare, and Pearl decides to improve Simon's quality of life. In the meantime Caleb and Liza Milton both die, leaving Pearl in charge of the household. Simon reveals his lust for Pearl, and they have sex while Nehemiah is away. Pearl becomes pregnant, and initially claims the child is Nehemiah's, before he learns the truth. Nehemiah indirectly kills Simon by causing him to commit suicide, which is covered up, and Pearl grieves for a long time.

Her child, Abigail, is sent to live with Nehemiah and her servant Mag in London. After a plague ravages London, both Nehemiah and Pearl move back to London with Abigail, who refuses to speak to Pearl or call her "mother." While in London Pearl learns that Nehemiah cheated on her many times with Mag while drunk. He later has an affair with the widow of an English army general. Pearl doesn't know how to feel about this until Doctor Devlin comes. He explains to Pearl the story of her conception, and gives her the scarlet "A" that her mother wore. Soon, London experiences a great fire, which burns all of Nehemiah's trading stock. Pearl permits Nehemiah to leave her for someone with fewer traumas, before leaving for New England with Devlin and Abigail to make a new life.

== Characters ==
- Pearl – the illegitimate child of Hester, wife of Nehemiah, and mother of Abigail. She is the main character.
- Hester – the mother of Pearl who is forced by law to wear a scarlet "A" on her chest because she committed adultery
- Doctor Devlin – the physician for the local minister and the man who had sex with Hester and claims to be the father of Pearl
- Liza – the servant of Caleb Milton, the father of Simon and Nehemiah. She is Pearl's friend.
- Simon – a blind boy whom Pearl befriends. She moves to England with him and eventually has sex with him. He is the father of Abigail.
- Nehemiah – the older brother of Simon whom Pearl marries. He is a merchant like his father.
- Mag – the servant of Pearl and Nehemiah in London who had an affair with Nehemiah.

== Reception ==
Mary Whippe of mostlyfiction.com gave a positive review, saying "Noyes imbues her debut novel with energy and literary weight, continuing Pearl's story while remaining faithful to the original which inspired it. Her ability to include period detail and to reproduce the religious beliefs and practices of the period give additional credence to her story, and the character of Pearl is free-spirited enough to strike a chord with modern readers" and finished by saying "pacing parallels that of Hawthorne, and her exploration of behavior as a series of good acts or acts inspired by the Devil is consistent with his". Jill Grinberg of Publishers Weekly also complimented the book by saying "engages with atmospheric charms of time and place, and though the major turns of the novel are predictable, she delivers an ending revelation that would surprise Hawthorne himself". Kate Ayers of ReadingGroupGuides.com gave another positive review, saying "While a dark tale, sad and poignant, it is a tale of ultimate enlightenment". Victoria Brownworth of the Chicago Tribune said "[the book] is an accomplished novel, stylistically sharp and metaphorically keen".
