= Meg Foster =

American actress (born 1948)

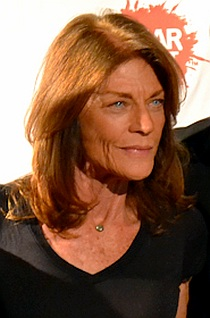
- Foster at Phoenix Film Festival in 2013
- Born: Margaret Wilson Foster; May 10, 1948 (age 78); Reading, Pennsylvania, U.S.
- Other name: The Eyes of 1979
- Education: Neighborhood Playhouse School of the Theatre
- Occupations: Actress; voice actress; stage actress
- Years active: 1968–present
- Spouse: Stephen McHattie (m. 1979, divorced)
- Partner(s): Ron Starr (1970–1976)
- Children: 1

Margaret Wilson "Meg" Foster (born May 10, 1948) is an American actress. Widely regarded by genre critics and peers as a definitive cult icon of alternative cinema, she is recognized as one of the most visually and vocally distinct performers of her generation. Foster's most defining trademark is her piercing, ice-blue eyes, which Mademoiselle magazine famously dubbed The eyes of 1979. She is noted for her intense emotional presence, technical precision rooted in classical theater training, and commanding delivery across fantasy, science fiction, and psychological drama. Her 50 year career has been characterized by injecting psychological depth and Shakespearean gravitas into commercial archetypes.

A graduate of the Neighborhood Playhouse School of the Theatre, Foster began her professional stage career in 1968 before quickly transitioning to Hollywood cinema and network television. She rose to early critical prominence for her nuanced dramatic turn in the miniseries The Scarlet Letter and the independent feature A Different Story. In the 1980s, Foster appeared in prominent genre film roles including Evil-Lyn in Masters of the Universe (1987) and a co-starring appearance in John Carpenter's They Live.

She was nominated for the Canadian Genie Awards and won an Indie Series Award for Best Guest Actress.

== Early life and education ==
Margaret Wilson Foster was born on May 10, 1948, in Reading, Pennsylvania, to David and Nancy (née Adamson) Foster. Her father was of Scotch-Irish ancestry and her mother was of English ancestry. She spent her childhood in the costal community of Rowayton, Connecticut, growing up alongside her four siblings; sisters Gray, Jan, and Nina, and brother Ian.

Foster discovered her inclination towards performance while attending a girls' boarding school in Lowell, Massachusetts, where she regularly participated in school plays. Upon completing her secondary education, she relocated to New York City to study formal method acting at the prestigious Neighborhood Playhouse School of the Theatre, where she studied extensively under acting coach Sanford Meisner. The Meisner technique's emphasis on behavior and emotional reality heavily informed Foster's subsequent character work and stage composition.

== Career ==
=== 1968-1979: Theatrical beginnings and breakthrough ===
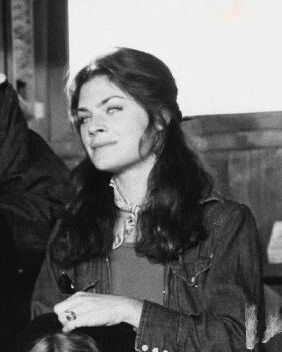
Foster in 1974

Foster began her professional career on the East Coast theatrical circuit. She made her formal stage debut in a 1968 Cornell Summer Theatre production of John Brown's Body, followed by her off-Broadway debut later in that year in Larry Arrick's production of The Empire Builders. She concurrently transitioned to television, making her screen debut in an episode of NET Playhouse (1968), followed by guest appearances on series such as Here Comes the Brides and The F.B.I..

The 1970s marked a period of rapid critical ascension for Foster. She stood out in features like Adam at 6 A.M. (1970) and gained significant acclaim for her starring role as Stella Cooke in the independent feature A Different Story (1978), a project praised for its early, non-stereotypical depiction of a lesbian protagonist. In 1979, Foster headlined WGBH'S highly regarded PBS miniseries adaptation of The Scarlet Letter. Her fierce, internally driven portrayal of Hester Prynne solidified her reputation as a powerful dramatic lead. By the close of the decade, her strikingly vivid physical features-most notably her intensely light blue eyes-became a cultural talking point, promoting Mademoiselle magazine to officially name her visage "the eyes of the 1979".

=== 1980-1999: Mainstream stardom and cult iconography ===
The turn of the decade marked a major shift for Foster as she moved into highly praised feature films and high-profile television movies, frequently collaborating with notable directors and earning critical recognition. In 1980, Foster starred as Greta alongside Jodie Foster, Robbie Robertson and Gary Busey in gritty drama Carny about carnival life. Her raw and nuanced performance was highly praised by critics for adding significant emotional weight and authenticity to the film's complex interpersonal dynamics.

She portrayed Katrina Van Tassel opposite Jeff Goldblum's Ichabod Crane in The Legend of Sleepy Hollow. Critics widely praised her performance, noting that her ethereal beauty and magnetic screen presence made her the perfect embodiment of the classic literary heroine.

Foster delivered a powerful dramatic performance as Ingrid in Canadian drama Ticket to Heaven about cult deprogramming. Her performance earned her a Genie Award nomination for Best Performance by a Foreign Actress, cementing her reputation as a serious big-screen talent.

In 1982, Foster was cast as Detective Christine Cagney in the inaugural six-episode season of the CBS television drama Cagney & Lacey when Loretta Swit was unable to reprise the role from the television film (due to her commitment to MASH). Though her performance was well-received by audiences, network executives replaced her with Sharon Gless, claiming that Foster's intense, sharp performance style was "too tough" for primetime commercial television at the time. Entertainment columnist Dick Kleiner wrote in August 1982 that Foster was disappointed and reportedly "felt as though she had been hit by a truck". Kleiner's story also implied Foster's dismissal from the show cost her other opportunities. "Until that news spread," he wrote, "she was an in-demand actress."

In 1983, she starred as Ali Tanner in director Sam Peckinpah's final feature film, a tense political thriller based on the Robert Ludlum novel The Osterman Weekend. In an ensemble cast that included Rutger Hauer and John Hurt, Foster's fierce performance as a protective mother defending her home was widely praised by critics as a clear highlight of the film, adding a grounded dignity to an otherwise divisive and complex plot. The film also featured her real-life son, Christopher Starr, playing her on-screen child.

She starred in The Emerald Forest (1985) directed by John Boorman, as Jean Markham, a grieving mother searching for her abducted son in the Amazon Rainforest. Her emotionally raw and deeply empathetic portrayal of parental grief was highly praised by critics, providing a vital, grounded emotional core to the sweeping epic.

She took on the leading role in Nico Mastorakis's psychological horror-thriller The Wind (1986), playing Sian Anderson, a novelist targeted by a psychopathic killer during a terrifying storm on a remote Greek island. Her performance was widely praised for anchoring the entire film, with reviewers noting how her distinct screen presence, vulnerability, and intense resourcefulness successfully elevated the tension of the cat-and-mouse narrative.

Foster subsequently shifted her focus toward major studio features and independent genre film, cementing her place in pop-culture history. In 1987, she portrayed the calculating sorceress Evil-Lyn in the live-action fantasy film Masters of the Universe. Rejecting standard animated caricature, she drew inspiration from William Shakespeare's Lady Macbeth, delivering a performance of cold, aristocratic malice. The following year, she starred opposite Roddy Piper as the enigmatic Holly Thompson in John Carpenter's anti-authoritarian science-fiction feature They Live. Carpenter utilized Foster's piercing, unreadable gaze to disorient audience expectations of her character's corporate nature.

In July 1995, Foster starred as Marcia Prior in the world premiere of Richard Alfieri's play The Sisters at the Tiffany Theater in Los Angeles, a contemporary adaptation of Anton Chekhov's . Her performance as the middle sister drew significant critical attention; a review in the Los Angeles Times described her stage presence as an "arresting cross between Lauren Bacall and Kirstie Alley," noting her strong command over the stage while characterizing the performance as bordering on intense melodrama. She was praised her ability to command the production's setting.

Throughout the 1990s, Foster became highly sought after by television show runners looking to bring immediate gravitas to speculative fiction. She recurred as the divine antagonist Hera across the syndicated fantasy universes of Hercules: The Legendary Journeys and Xena: Warrior Princess. She also delivered notable guest turns in Quantum Leap and Star Trek: Deep Space Nine, while concurrently anchoring various action and thriller films during the direct-to-video boom, including Project Shadowchaser (1994) and Oblivion 2: Backlash (1996).

=== 2000-present: Independent cinema and voice work ===
In the 21st century, Foster re-emerged as a respected veteran actress, frequently collaborating with a new wave of alternative filmmakers. Visionary horror director Rob Zombie cast her in prominent, transformative roles in The Lords of Salem (2012) and 31 (2016), introducing her signature intensity to a younger generation of cinema enthusiasts. In 2017, Foster expanded her cult status into the modern animation and superhero community by joining the DC Animated Movie Universe. She voiced the villainous Mother Mayhem (Marie Logan) in the acclaimed animated feature Teen Titans: The Judas Contract. Her performance resonated deeply within the Teen Titans fandom and broader animation communities. Viewers praised how her sinister voice perfectly matched the dark, mature tone of the iconic Judas Contract storyline, introducing her legendary genre presence to a completely new generation of fans.

In 2020, Foster won the Indie Series Award for Best Guest Actress for her work in the drama series A Place Called Hollywood. Bringing her artistic legacy full circle, she lent her distinctively rich, velvety voice to the character Motherboard in Netflix's animated epic Masters of the Universe, returning to the franchise that had hosted her one of the famous live-action roles decades prior.

== Reception and legacy ==
Foster's acting technique is characterized by an exceptional level of control and behavioral restraint. Critics have frequently highlighted her ability to dominate scenes through quietude, relying on what has been termed the "unreadable language of her gaze" rather than theatrical over-expression.

Foster's low, husky vocal delivery has been widely recognized as a primary tool for her characterization, enabling her to convey immense administrative and psychological threat without escalating her volume.

Her striking natural blue eye color occasionally posed a challenge. Multiple directors considered her gaze distracting, and requested she wear tinted contact lenses or sunglasses.

== Personal life ==
Foster married Canadian actor Stephen McHattie in 1979, but they later divorced.

She was also in a long-term relationship with American actor Ron Starr. They have one child, a son named Christopher Starr (born October 3, 1971). Christopher briefly appeared as a child actor, portraying his mother's on-screen son in Sam Peckinpah's final political thriller The Osterman Weekend (1983).

During Cagney & Lacey filming, Foster and co-star Tyne Daly developed a deep mutual respect and a lifelong friendship. Daly was a vocal supporter of Foster during the studio backlash, later admitting that navigating the network's sudden political ousting of her friend was one of the most personally challenging times of her career; despite the briefness of their professional pairing, the two actresses remained close friends for decades after the series concluded.

Foster has famously maintained a strictly private lifestyle away from the commercial Hollywood landscape, choosing to raise her son entirely outside the entertainment industry.

== Filmography ==
=== Film ===
Year	Title	Role	Notes
1970	Adam at 6 A.M.	Joyce	
1971	The Todd Killings	Waitress	
1972	Thumb Tripping	Shay	
1974	Welcome to Arrow Beach	Robbin Stanley	
1978	A Different Story	Stella Cooke	
1980	The Legend of Sleepy Hollow	Katrina Van Tassel	
1980	Carny	Gerta	
1981	Ticket to Heaven	Ingrid	Nominated—Genie Award for Best Performance by a Foreign Actress
1983	The Osterman Weekend	Ali Tanner	
1985	The Emerald Forest	Jean Markham	
1986	The Wind	Sian Anderson	
1987	Masters of the Universe	Evil-Lyn	
1988	Riding Fast	Sara	
1988	They Live	Holly Thompson	
1989	Leviathan	Ms. Martin	
1989	Relentless	Carol Dietz	
1989	Blind Fury	Lynn Devereaux	
1989	Stepfather II	Carol Grayland	
1990	Tripwire	Julia	
1990	Jezebel's Kiss	Amanda Faberson	
1990	Back Stab	Sara Rudnick	
1991	Diplomatic Immunity	Gerta Hermann	
1991	Future Kick	Nancy	
1992	Project Shadowchaser	Sarah	
1992	Dead On: Relentless II	Carol Dietz	
1993	Hidden Fears	Maureen Dietz	
1993	Best of the Best 2	Sue MacCauley	
1994	Oblivion	Stell Barr	
1994	Shrunken Heads	Maureen "Big Moe"	
1994	Immortal Combat	Quinn	
1994	Lady in Waiting	Carrie	
1995	The Killers Within	Laura Seaton	
1995	Undercover Heat	Mrs. V.	
1996	Oblivion 2: Backlash	Stell Barr	
1997	Space Marines	Commander Lasser	
1998	Lost Valley	Mary-Ann Compton	
1998	The Man in the Iron Mask	Queen Anne of France	Not to be confused with the other The Man in the Iron Mask 1998 film, which featured Anne Parillaud as Anne
1998	Spoiler	Woman #1	
1999	The Minus Man	Irene	
2003	Being with Eddie	Elinor	Short film
2004	Coming Up Easy	Mom	
2011	25 Hill	Audrey Gibbs	
2011	Sebastian	Gloria	
2012	The Lords of Salem	Margaret Morgan	
2016	Three Days in August	Maggie	
2016	31	Venus Virgo	
2017	Teen Titans: The Judas Contract	Mother Mayhem	Voice
2017	Jeepers Creepers 3	Gaylen Brandon	
2018	A Reckoning	Diane Maple	
2018	Any Bullet Will Do	Ma Whitman	
2018	Overlord	Chloe's Aunt	
2019	Investigation 13	Layla Parrish	
2020	There's No Such Thing as Vampires	Sister Frank	
2022	Hellblazers	Mary	
TBD	Haunted: 333	Momma McDonald	Post-production

=== Television films ===
Year	Title	Role
1971	The Death of Me Yet	Alice
1973	Sunshine	Nora
1974	Things in Their Season	Judy Pines
1975	Promise Him Anything	Marjorie
1976	James Dean	Dizzy Sheridan
1977	Sunshine Christmas	Nora
1979	The Scarlet Letter	Hester Prynne
1980	Guyana Tragedy: The Story of Jim Jones	Jean Richie
1983	Desperate Intruder	Joanna Walcott
1984	Best Kept Secrets	Shari Mitchell
1987	Desperate	Dorymae
1988	Betrayal of Silence	Julie
1992	To Catch a Killer	City Attorney Linda Carlson
1997	Deep Family Secrets	Ellen

=== Television series ===
Year	Title	Role	Notes
1969	NET Playhouse	Praxithia	Episode: "The Prodigal"
1970	Here Come the Brides	Callie Marsh	Episode: "Two Worlds"
1970	The Interns	Sharon	Episode: "Eyes of the Beholder"
1970	Mod Squad	Cora	Episode: "Who Are the Keepers, Who Are the Inmates?"
1971	Mod Squad	Carolyn	Episode: "Death of a Nobody"
1971	Men at Law	Barbara Millett	Episode: "Hostage"
1971	Bonanza	Mrs. Evangeline Woodtree	Episode: "The Silent Killer"
1971	Dan August	Em Jackson	2 episodes
1971	The F.B.I.	Marcy Brown	Episode: "The Recruiter"
1972	The F.B.I.	Marcy Brown	Episode: "A Second Life"
1972	Young Dr. Kildare	Rebecca	Episode: "The Legacy"
1972	The Sixth Sense	Carey Evers	Episode: "Gallows in the Wind"
1972	Mannix	Sheila	Episode: "A Game of Shadows"
1972	Medical Center	Carol McKinnon	Episode: "Conflict"
1972	Circle of Fear	Julie Barnes	Episode: "At the Cradle Foot"
1973	Circle of Fear	Penny Wiseman	Episode: "Spare Parts"
1973	Hawaii Five-O	Nina	Episode: "The Child Stealers"
1973	Cannon	Linda Morrow	Episode: "Come Watch Me Die"
1973	Barnaby Jones	Doris Talbot	Episode: "A Little Glory, a Little Death"
1974	Barnaby Jones	Glenda	Episode: "A Cold Record for Murder"
1974	Barnaby Jones	Gina Nelson	Episode: "Blueprint for a Caper"
1974	Medical Center	Cassie	Episode: "Web of Intrigue"
1974	The F.B.I.	Paula Taylor	Episode: "The Animal"
1974	The Six Million Dollar Man	Minonee	Episode: "Straight on 'till Morning"
1975	Sunshine	Nora	13 episodes
1975	The Streets of San Francisco	Nancy Elizabeth Mellon	Episode: "Trail of Terror"
1975	Bronk	Margaret Lewis	Episode: "Short Fuse"
1975	Three for the Road	Patti Hardy	Episode: "The Albatross"
1975	Baretta	Lola	Episode: "Ragtime Billy Peaches"
1975	Baretta	Stella	Episode: "Count the Days I'm Gone"
1976	Hawaii Five-O	Anne Waring	Episode: "Double Exposure"
1977	Washington: Behind Closed Doors	Jennie Jamison	6 episodes
1977	Police Story	Nancy	Episode: "Trigger Point"
1982	Cagney & Lacey	Det. Chris Cagney	6 episodes - first cancelled season
1985	The Twilight Zone	Jenny	Episode: "Dreams for Sale"
1985	Murder, She Wrote	Del Scott	Episode: "Joshua Peabody Died Here... Possibly"
1987	Miami Vice	Alice Carson	Episode: "Contempt of Court"
1988	Miami Vice	Alice Carson	Episode: "Blood & Roses"
1988	The Cosby Show	Diane Hemmings	Episode: "Trust Me"
1989	Midnight Caller	Annie Driscoll	Episode: "Wait Until Midnight"
1989	The Hitchhiker	Deirdre	Episode: "The Martyr"
1990–91	The Trials of Rosie O'Neill	D.A. Deb Grant	3 episodes
1990	The Young Riders	Mary Lou	Episode: "Decoy"
1991	Shannon's Deal	Eva Melville	Episode: "Trouble"
1992	Reasonable Doubts	Anna Dare	Episode: "Moment of Doubt"
1992	Quantum Leap	Laura Fuller	3 episodes
1994	Fortune Hunter	Georgia Appleton	Episode: "Millennium"
1995	ER	Mrs. Rose	Episode: "Make of Two Hearts"
1996	Murder, She Wrote	Laura Kerwin	Episode: "The Dark Side of the Door"
1996	Star Trek: Deep Space Nine	Onaya	Episode: "The Muse"
1996	Mr. & Mrs. Smith	Athena	Episode: "The Kidnapping Episode"
1998–99	Hercules: The Legendary Journeys	Hera	2 episodes
1999	Sliders	Col. Margaret Burke	Episode: "Slide by Wire"
2000	Xena: Warrior Princess	Hera	Episode: "God-Fearing Child"
2013	Hjem	Mina	Episode: "#2.7"
2013–16	Pretty Little Liars	Carla Grunwald	5 episodes
2013–14	Ravenswood	Carla Grunwald	7 episodes
2015	The Originals	Josephine LaRue	5 episodes
2016	Baskets	Thelma	Episode: "Cowboys"
2017	Twin Peaks	Cashier	Episode: "Part 3"
2024	Masters of the Universe: Revolution	Motherboard (voice)	4 Episodes

== Stage ==
=== Theatre ===
Year	Title	Role(s)	Venue(s)	Notes
1968	John Brown's Body	Ensemble	Cornell Summer Theatre	Debut
1968	The Empire Builders	Zenobia	Astor Place Theatre	Her official Off-Broadway debut in Larry Arrick's production of Boris Vian's absurdist piece.
1983	Extremities	Marjorie	Los Angeles Public Theatre	She led Robert Allan Ackerman's highly publicized, physically grueling production as a woman capturing her attacker.
1986	The Three Sisters	Olga	Los Angeles Theatre Center	The premiere production that opened the brand new LATC facility.
1989	Strong-Man’s Weak Child	Evie	Los Angeles Theatre Center	The West Coast premiere of Israel Horovitz's heavy domestic drama
1991	King Lear's	Goneril / Regan	Los Angeles Theatre Center / Regional Repertory	Directed by Stein Wenge, a dark, stylized Shakespearean adaptation.
1995	The Sisters	Marcia Prior	Tiffany Theater / Playhouse West Los Angeles	A modernized, highly dramatic world-premiere adaptation of Chekhov's themes written by Richard Alfieri.
1996	Indiscretions (Les Parents Terribles)	Leonie	Coconut Grove Playhouse (Miami, FL)	Co-starred with Greg Mullavey in Jeremy Sams' acclaimed English translation of Jean Cocteau's dark comedy.
2001-2002	The Dinner Party	Gabrielle Bunocelli	Coconut Grove Playhouse & Paper Mill Playhouse (Milburn, NJ)	She headlined the first post-Broadway production of Neil Simon's hit play, directed by John Rando.
2004	The Tale of the Allergist's Wife	Lee Green	Paper Mill Playhouse	Starred alongside daytime drama icon Robin Strasser in Charles Busch's social comedy.
2004	Barabbas	Ensemble	New York Stage	Staged adaptation of Pär Lagerkvist's novel exploring the psychological aftermath of the biblical figure.

== Awards and nominations ==
Year	Award	Category	Result	Title	Ref.
1979	Photoplay Awards	Favorite Female Newcomer	Nominated	Accolade of the era highlighting her breakout popularity	
1982	3rd Genie Awards	Best Performance by a Foreign Actress	Nominated	Ticket to Heaven	
2014	Fangoria Chainsaw Awards	Best Supporting Actress	Nominated	The Lords of Salem	
2016	BloodGuts UK Horror Awards	Best Supporting Actress	Nominated	31	
2020	FilmQuest	Best Supporting Actress	Nominated	There's No Such Thing as Vampires	
2020	Indie Series Awards	Best Guest Actress in a Drama Series	Won	A Place Called Hollywood	

== Bibliography ==
- "Masters of the Universe". SFX (240). Future plc: 82–85. November 2013.
