= Tucker Wiard =

American television editor (1941–2022)

- Born: November 10, 1941; Detroit, Michigan, U.S.
- Died: August 28, 2022 (aged 80); Los Angeles, California, U.S.
- Education: Michigan State University
- Occupation: Television editor
- Spouse: Nancy Bradley

Tucker Wiard (November 10, 1941 – August 28, 2022) was an American television editor. He won five Primetime Emmy Awards and was nominated for six more in the category Outstanding Picture Editing.

Wiard died on August 28, 2022, from complications of heart failure in Los Angeles, California, at the age of 80.
