= Elizabeth Pain =

American settler

Elizabeth Pain (c. 1652 – 26 November 1704), sometimes spelled Elizabeth Paine or Elisabeth Payne, was a settler in colonial Boston who was brought to trial after the death of her child. She was acquitted of the murder charge but found guilty of negligence, fined, and flogged. According to some writers and by popular tradition, aspects of Pain's life and her gravestone are considered an inspiration for the life and grave of character Hester Prynne in the novel The Scarlet Letter by Nathaniel Hawthorne.

== Biography ==
Pain was a spinster who had a child out of wedlock, considered evidence of illegal fornication. She later married Samuel Pain.

On March 6, 1692, the child died. Pain was brought to trial for murder in 1693. She was found not guilty of murder but was found guilty of negligence in not seeking help. She was fined and ordered to be whipped with twenty lashes. According to court records:

Elisabeth Payne spinster being presented by the Grand Jury, in March last for murdering of her child was now brought to the Barr & Indicted by the name of Elizabeth Payne spinster for not having the feare of God before her eyes & being led by the Instigation of the diuil did on our about the 6th day of March last willfully murder her child Contrary to the Peace of our Soueraigne Lord the king his Crowne & dignity the laws of God and of this Jurisdiction holding up her hand at the Barr pleaded not Guilty & put herself on trial by God & the Country. Accordingly, after the Indictment & evidence produced were read Committed to the Jury and are on file the Jury brought in their verdict not Guilty according to Indictment but greatly negligent in not calling for help for the preservation of the child's life. The Court on Consideration of the Case for her fornication sentenced her to be whipped with twenty stripes paying & discharging the charge of her trial & fees of the Court stands Committed till the sentence be performed.

== Posthumous fame ==
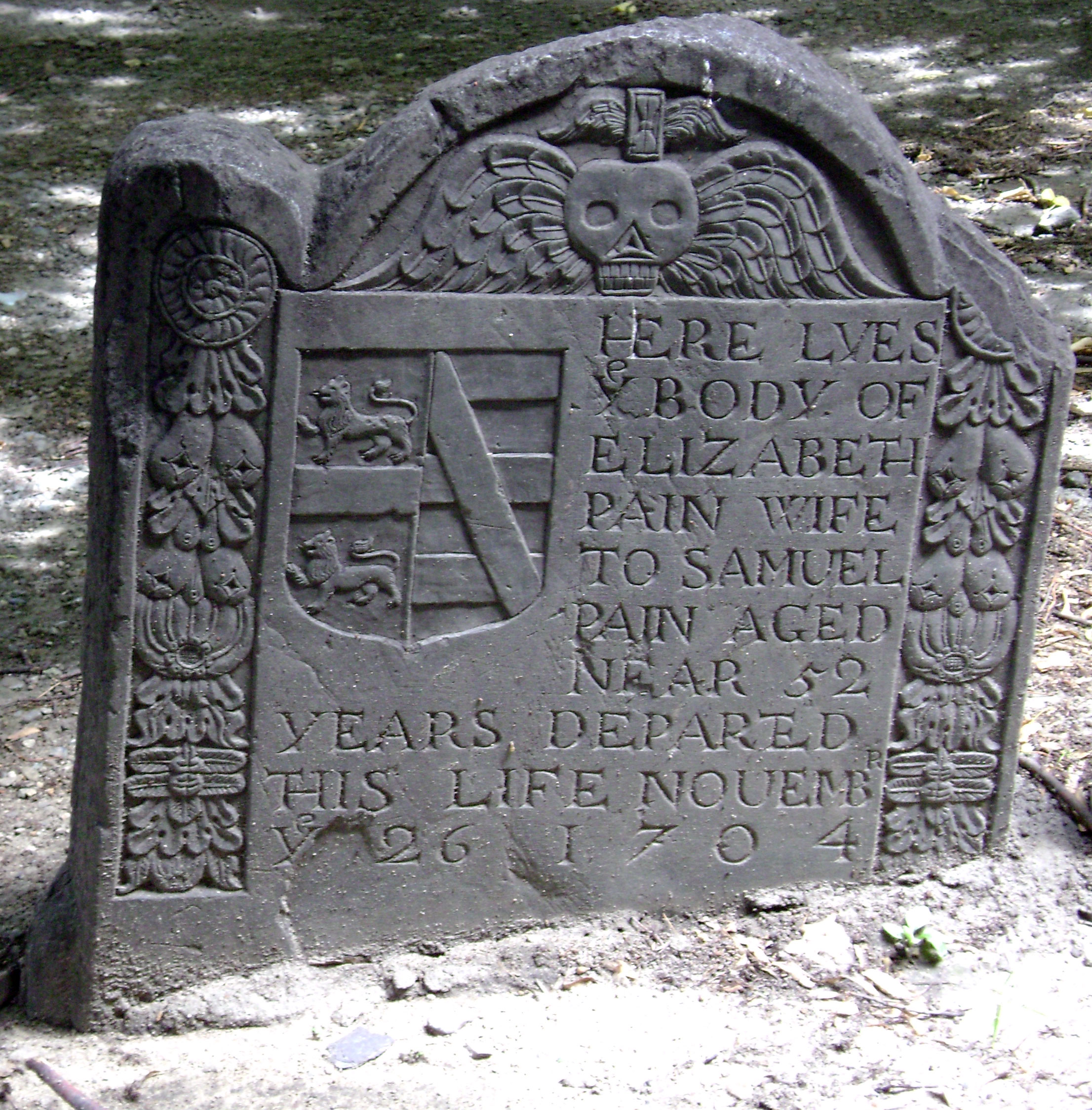
Elizabeth Pain's gravestone in King's Chapel Burying Ground in Boston, Massachusetts

Pain's grave is at King's Chapel Burying Ground in Boston, Massachusetts, and is engraved:

HERE LYES Y^{e} BODY OF ELIZABETH PAIN WIFE TO SAMUEL PAIN AGED NEAR 52 YEARS, DEPARTED THIS LIFE NOUEMB^{R} Y^{e} 26 1704

Pain's grave is in the same cemetery mentioned in The Scarlet Letter, which ends with a description of Hester Prynne's grave:

So said Hester Prynne, and glanced her sad eyes downward at the scarlet letter. And, after many, many years, a new grave was delved, near an old and sunken one, in that burial–ground beside which King's Chapel has since been built. It was near that old and sunken grave, yet with a space between, as if the dust of the two sleepers had no right to mingle. Yet one tomb-stone served for both. All around, there were monuments carved with armorial bearings; and on this simple slab of slate—as the curious investigator may still discern, and perplex himself with the purport—there appeared the semblance of an engraved escutcheon. It bore a device, a herald's wording of which may serve for a motto and brief description of our now concluded legend; so sombre is it, and relieved only by one ever-glowing point of light gloomier than the shadow:—

"ON A FIELD, SABLE, THE LETTER A, GULES"

Pain's headstone has "an engraved escutcheon" on which enthusiasts see [part of] the letter A (for adultery): it appears in the shield to the right of two lions. Scholar Laurie Rozakis has argued that an alternate or additional source for the story may be Hester Craford, a woman flogged for fornication with John Wedg.
