= King's Chapel Burying Ground =

Graveyard in Boston, Massachusetts

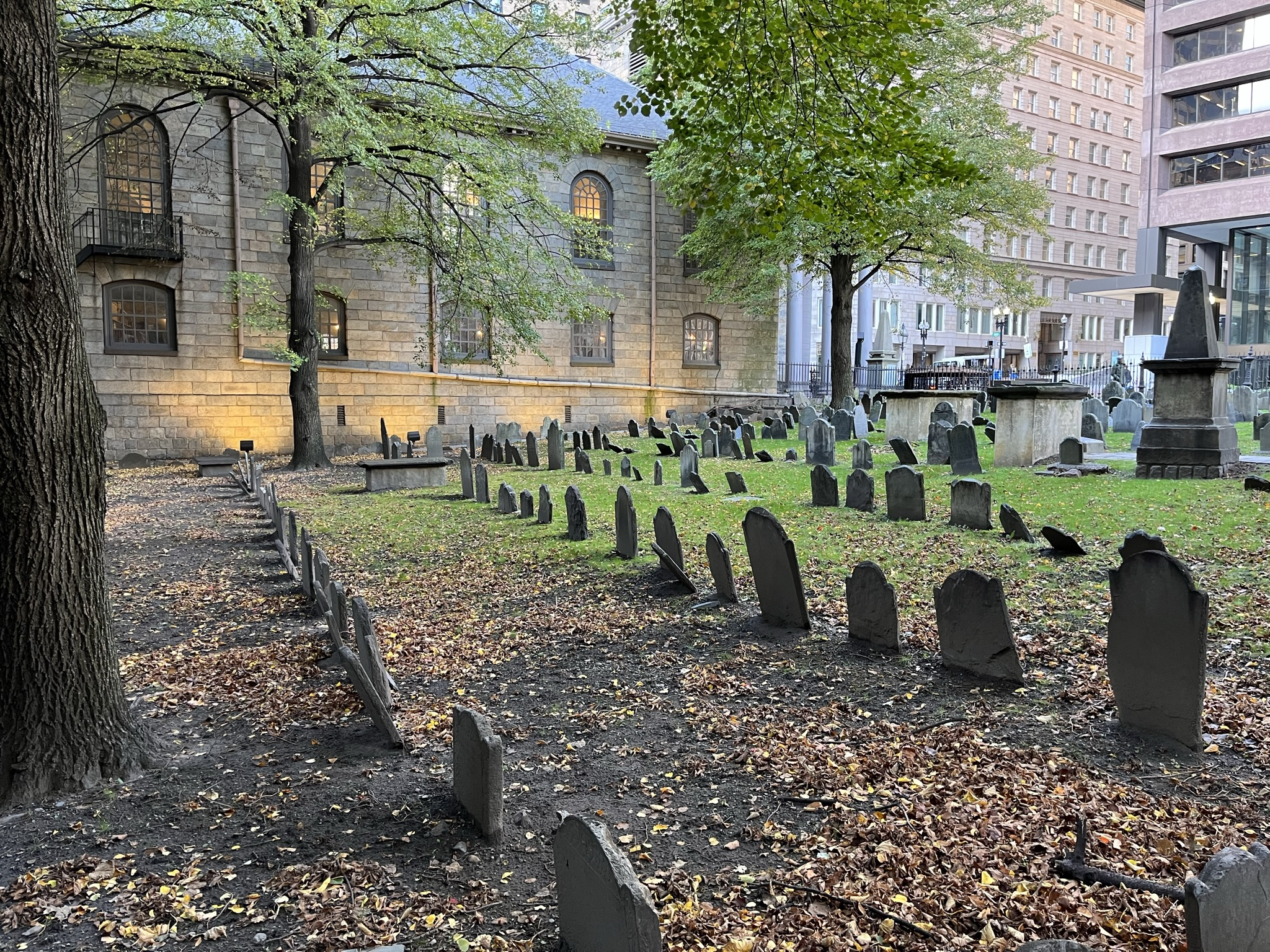
- The graveyard in 2022, looking toward King's Chapel and Tremont Street
- Interactive map of King's Chapel Burying Ground

Details
- Established: 1630
- Location: Tremont and School Streets, Boston, Massachusetts
- Coordinates: 42°21′29.7″N 71°3′35.4″W
- No. of graves: 1,600+

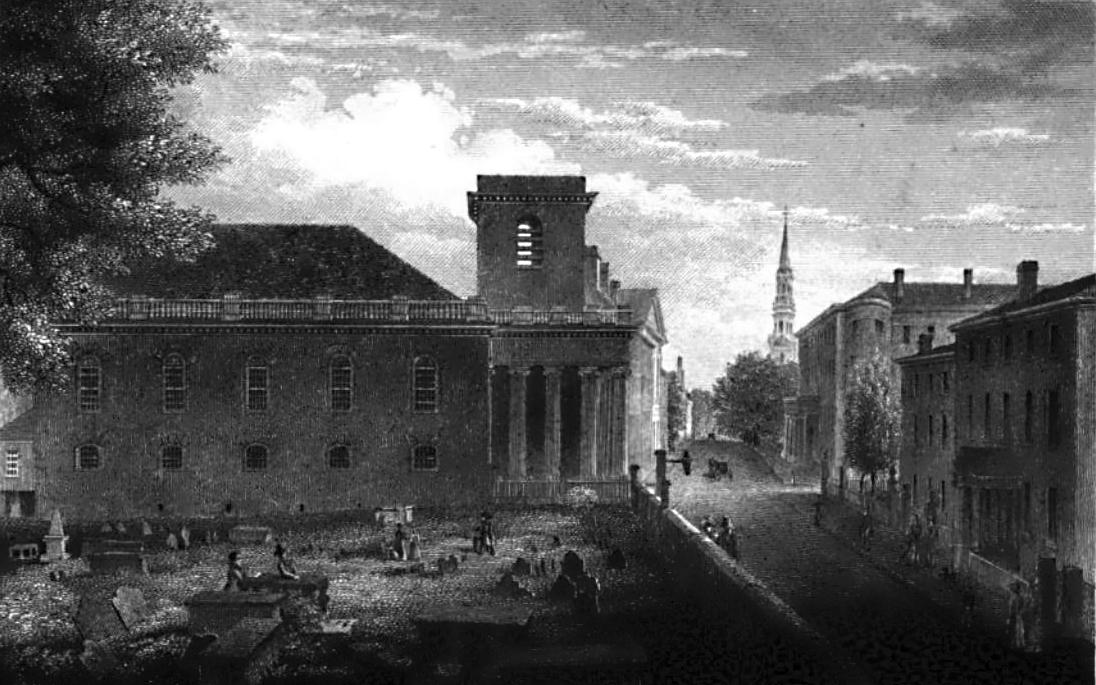
King's Chapel and Burying Ground, 1833

King's Chapel Burying Ground is a historic graveyard on Tremont Street in Boston, Massachusetts, near its intersection with School Street, established in 1630. It is the oldest graveyard in the city and is a site on the Freedom Trail. The graveyard pre-dates the adjacent King's Chapel, whose first structure was built in 1688, and it is not affiliated with any church despite its name.

== History ==
King's Chapel Burying Ground was founded in 1630 as the first graveyard in the city of Boston. According to custom, the first interment was that of the land's owner, Isaac Johnson. It was Boston's only burial site for 30 years (1630–1660). The local Anglican congregation was allotted land in the graveyard to build King's Chapel in 1686, being unable to locate land elsewhere.

In an 1855 Boston Evening Transcript article, a Boston resident wrote that some years before, he had personally witnessed the Burying Ground's superintendent rearrange the site's headstones into neat rows and columns without moving their corresponding buried remains. As a result, many of the headstones today do not match the precise burial locations of the individuals listed on the stones.

Today there are 505 headstones and 59 footstones remaining from the more than one thousand people buried in the small space since its inception. There are also 78 tombs, of which 36 have markers. This includes the large vault, built as a charnel house and converted into a tomb for children's remains in 1833. The earliest tombs are scattered among the grave markers. Most are in tabletop form.

== Notable burials ==
- Charles Apthorp, merchant, slave trader
- Francis Brinley, American landowner, government official, philanthropist and military officer
- Mary Chilton, Plymouth Pilgrim, first European woman to step ashore in New England
- Captain Roger Clapp, member of the Ancient and Honorable Artillery Company of Massachusetts, died February 2, 1691, formerly lived at Dorchester (Capt. Clapp's son Desire is also interred close by)
- John Cotton, Puritan theologian
- John Davenport, Puritan theologian
- William Dawes (disputed), American Revolution hero
- William Emerson (father of Ralph Waldo Emerson)
- Robert Keayne, first captain of the Ancient and Honorable Artillery Company of Massachusetts
- John Leverett, colonial governor of Massachusetts
- John Oxenbridge, Puritan theologian
- Elizabeth Pain, whose headstone is apocryphally claimed to be the inspiration for Hester Prynne's in The Scarlet Letter
- Major Thomas Savage, distinguished settler and soldier, son-in-law of Ann Hutchinson
- Frederic Tudor, Boston's "Ice King"
- Hezekiah Usher, first bookseller and book publisher in the British Colonies
- Samuel Waldo, 1696–1759
- John Wilson Puritan theologian
- John Winthrop, first Puritan governor of Massachusetts

== Image gallery ==
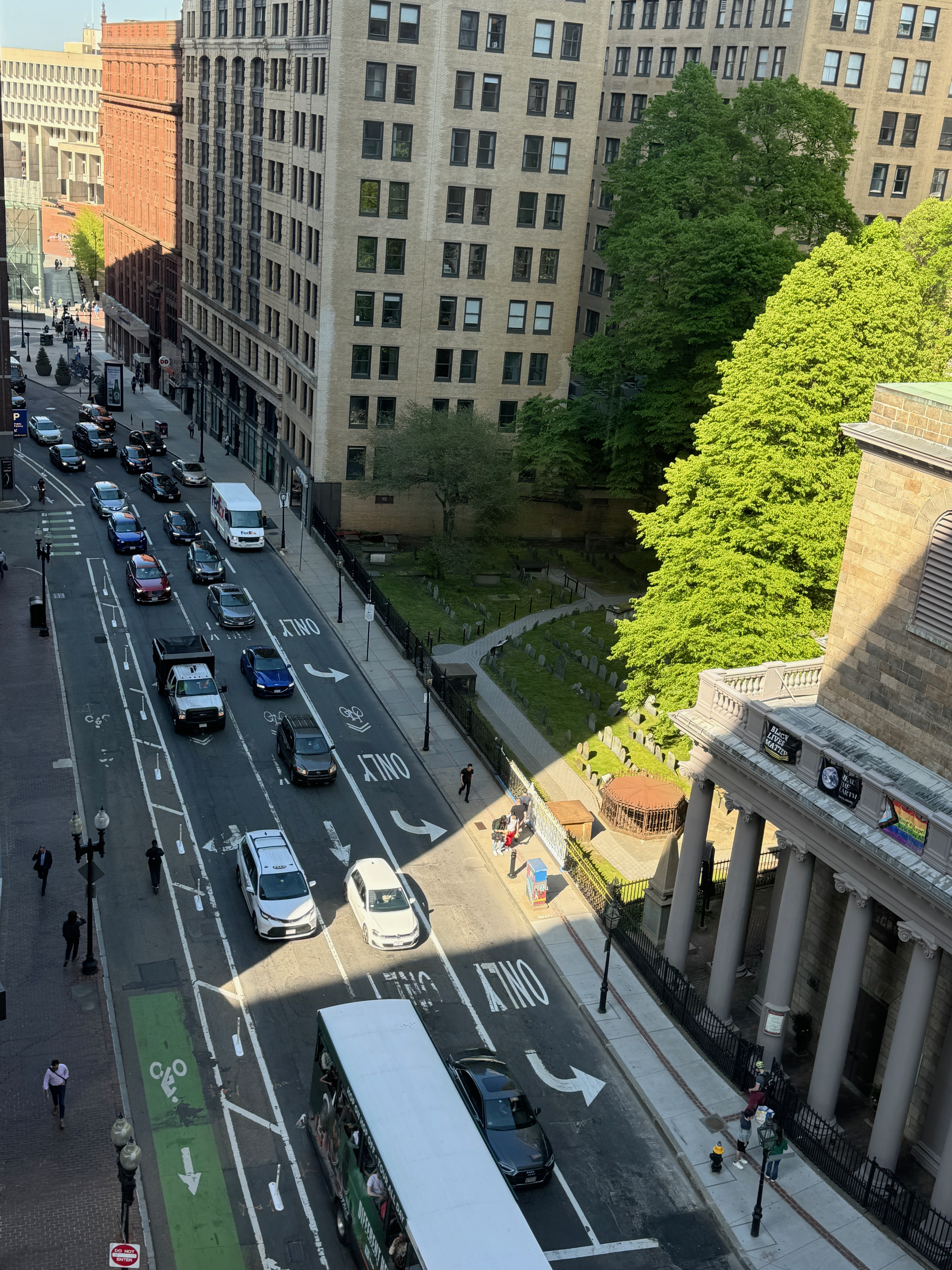
Looking north along Tremont Street, showing the burying ground's location beside the chapel (2024)

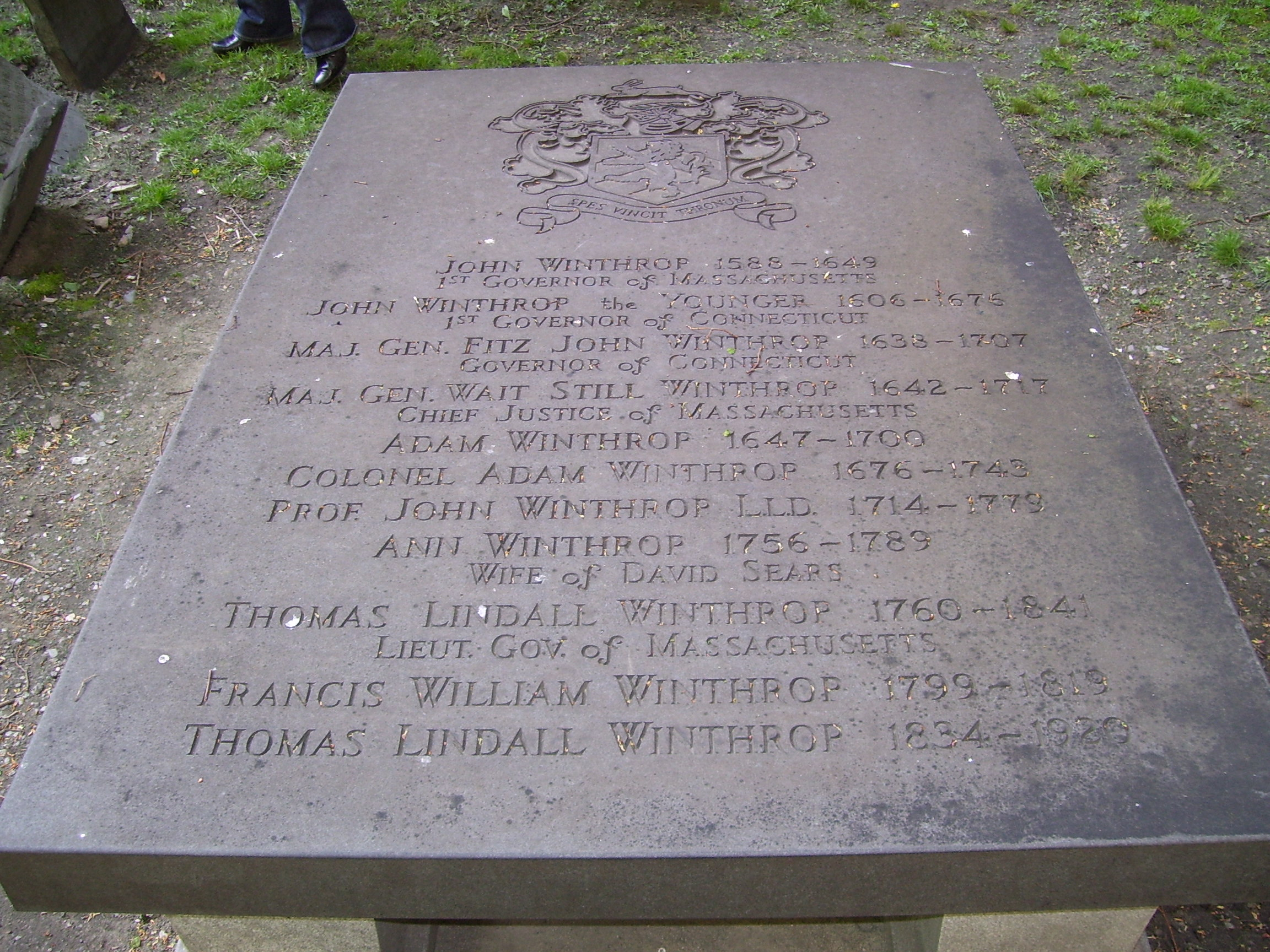
John Winthrop's Tomb (died 1649)

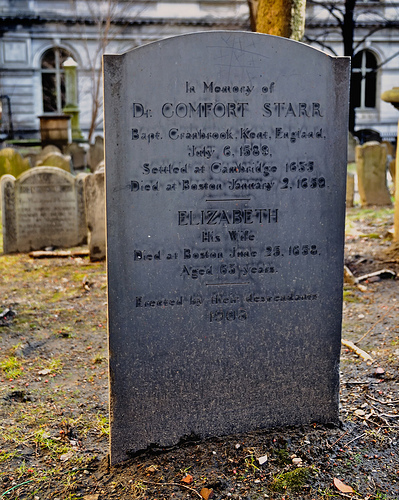
Tombstone of Dr. Comfort Starr and wife Elizabeth.

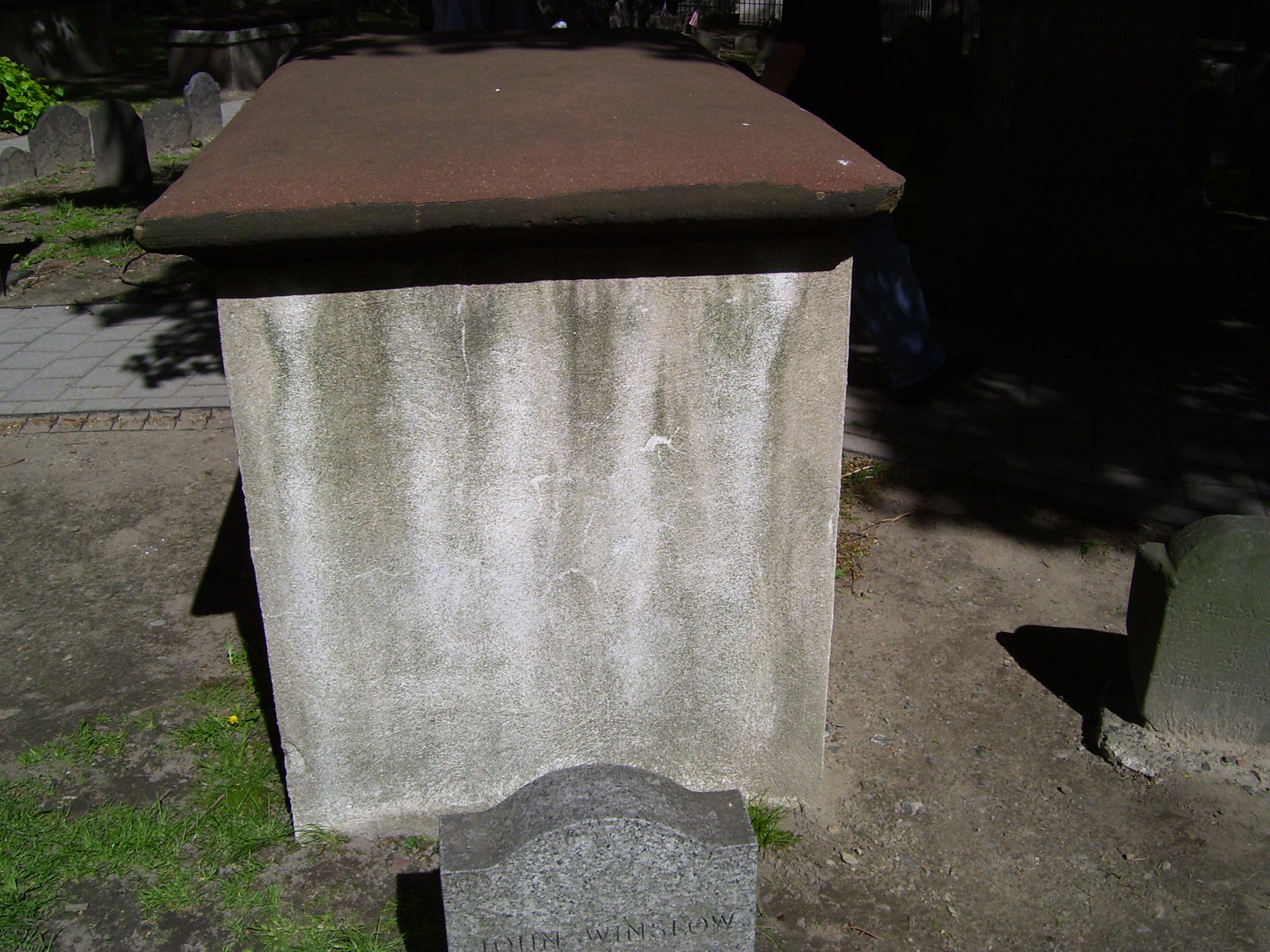
Mary Chilton Winslow's burial spot in the Winslow Tomb (died c. 1679)

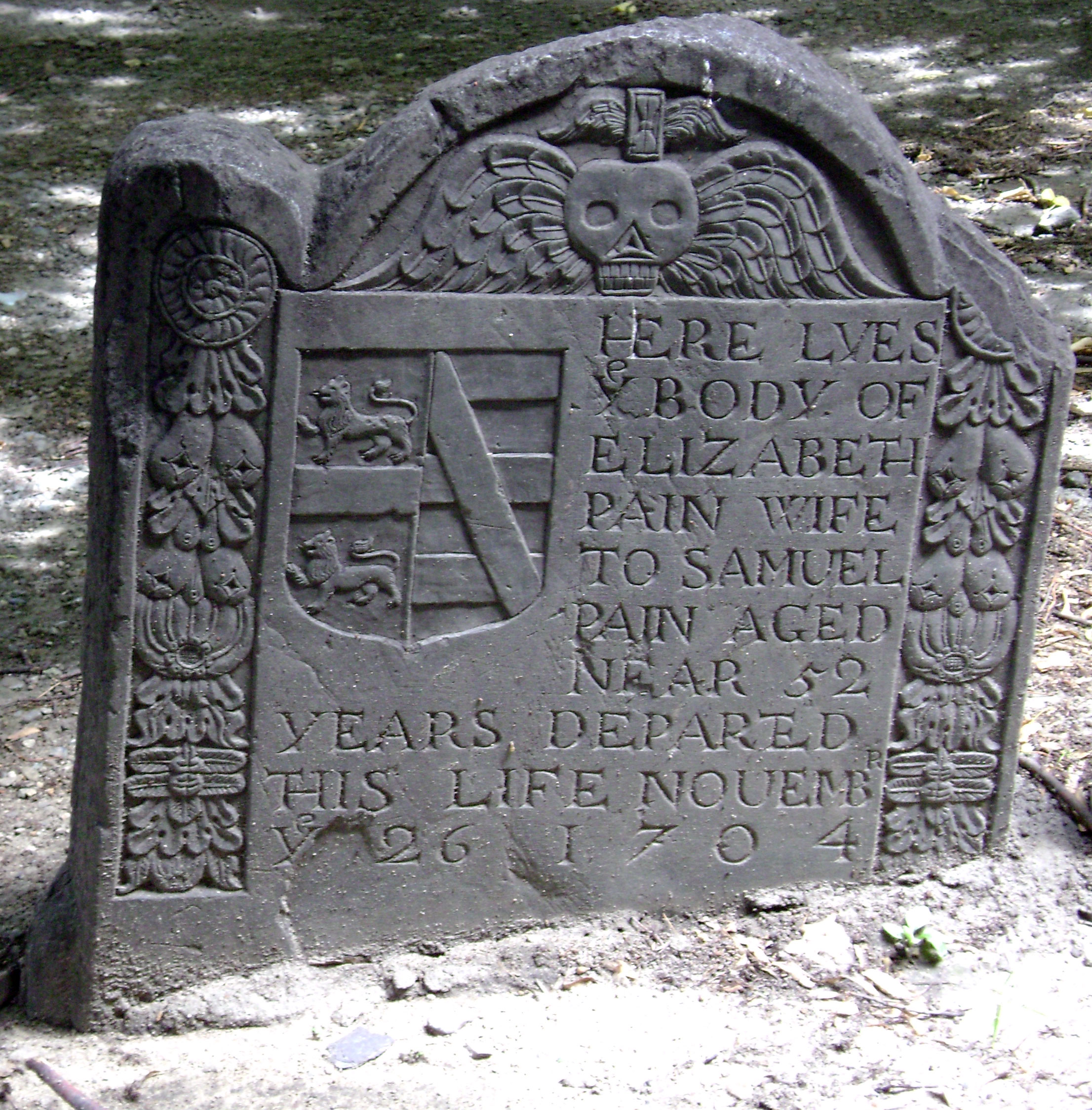
Elizabeth Pain marker (died 1704)

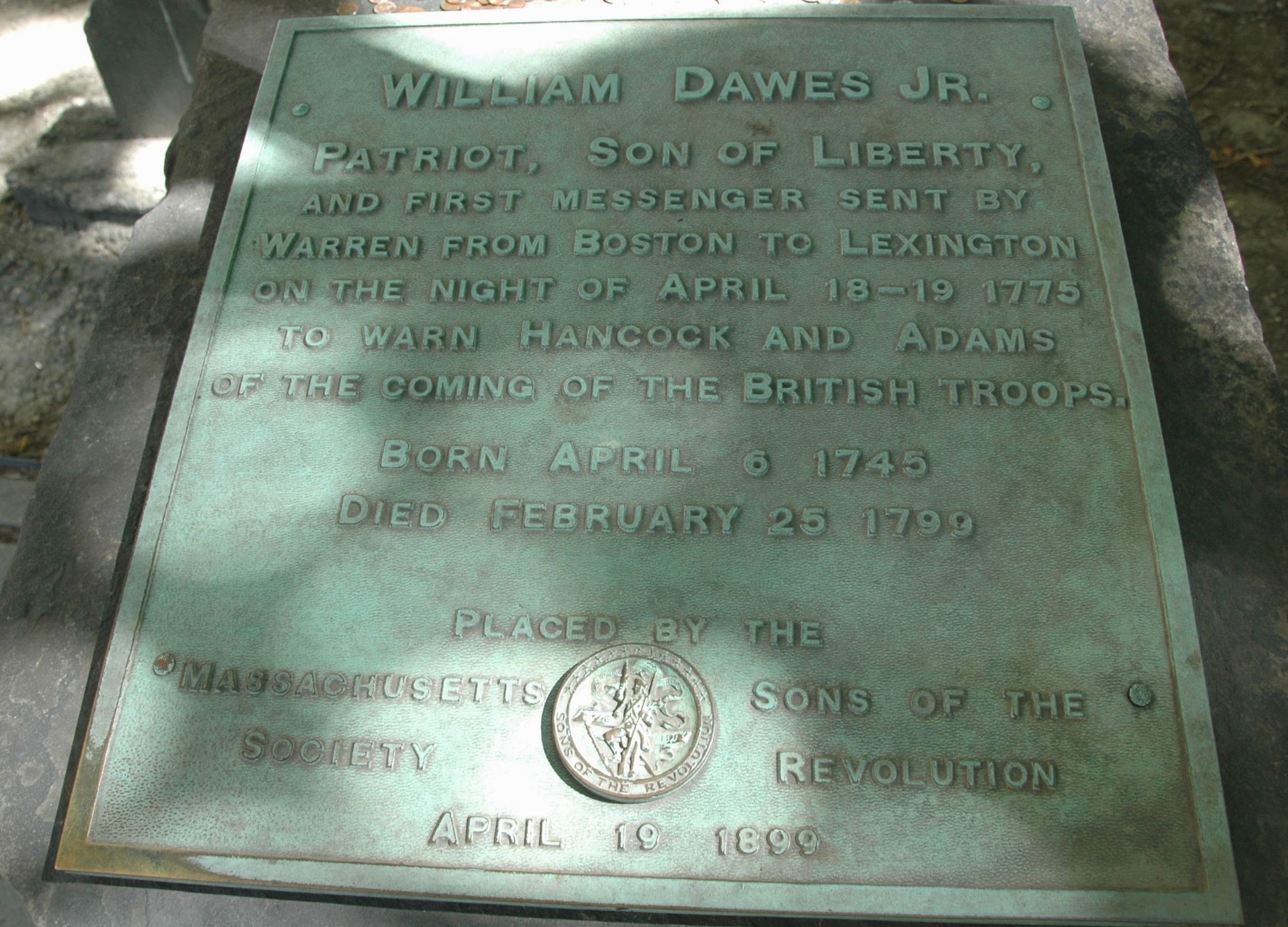
William Dawes tomb marker (died 1799)

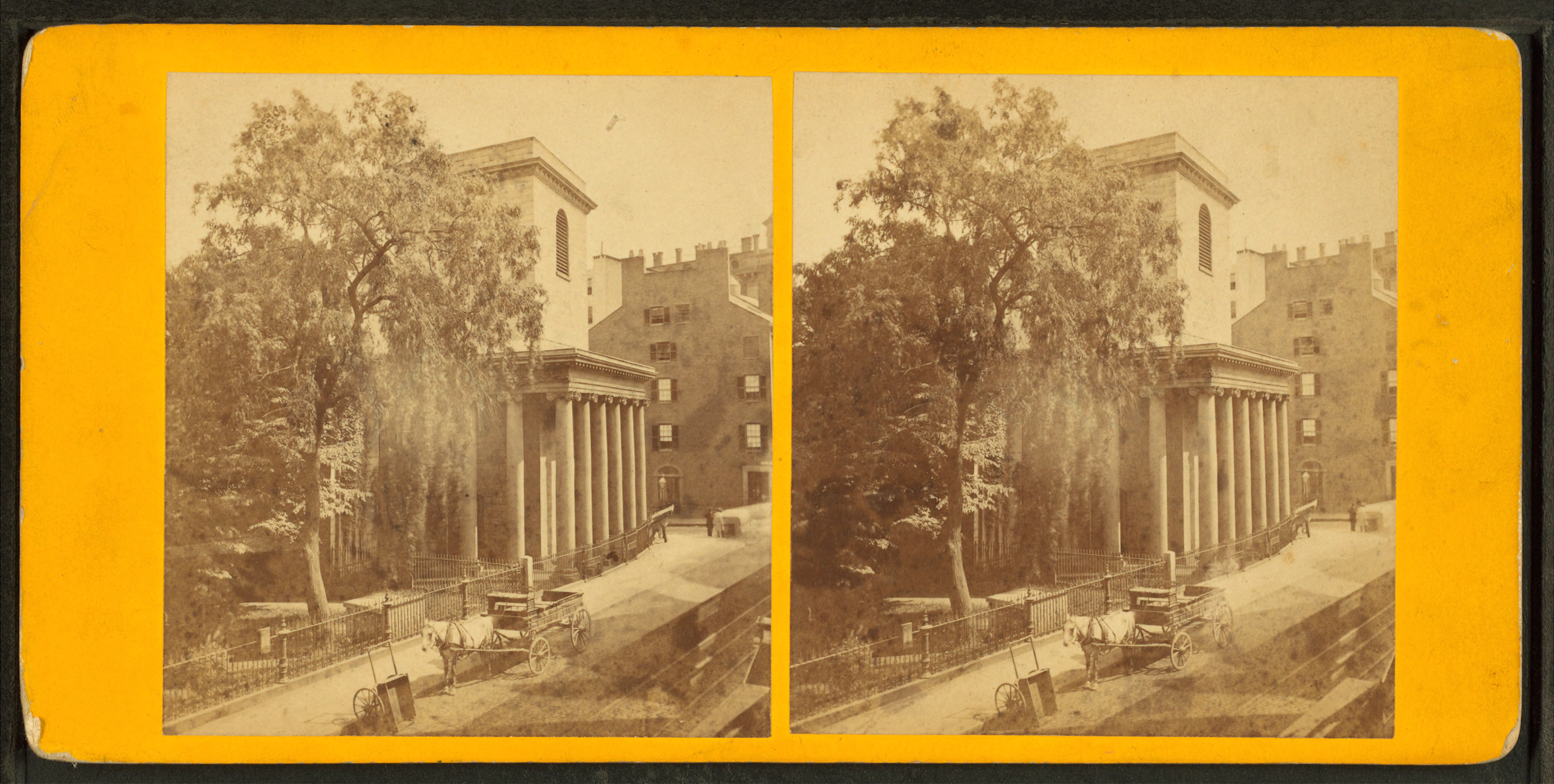
King's Chapel (right) and Burying Ground (left), 19th century

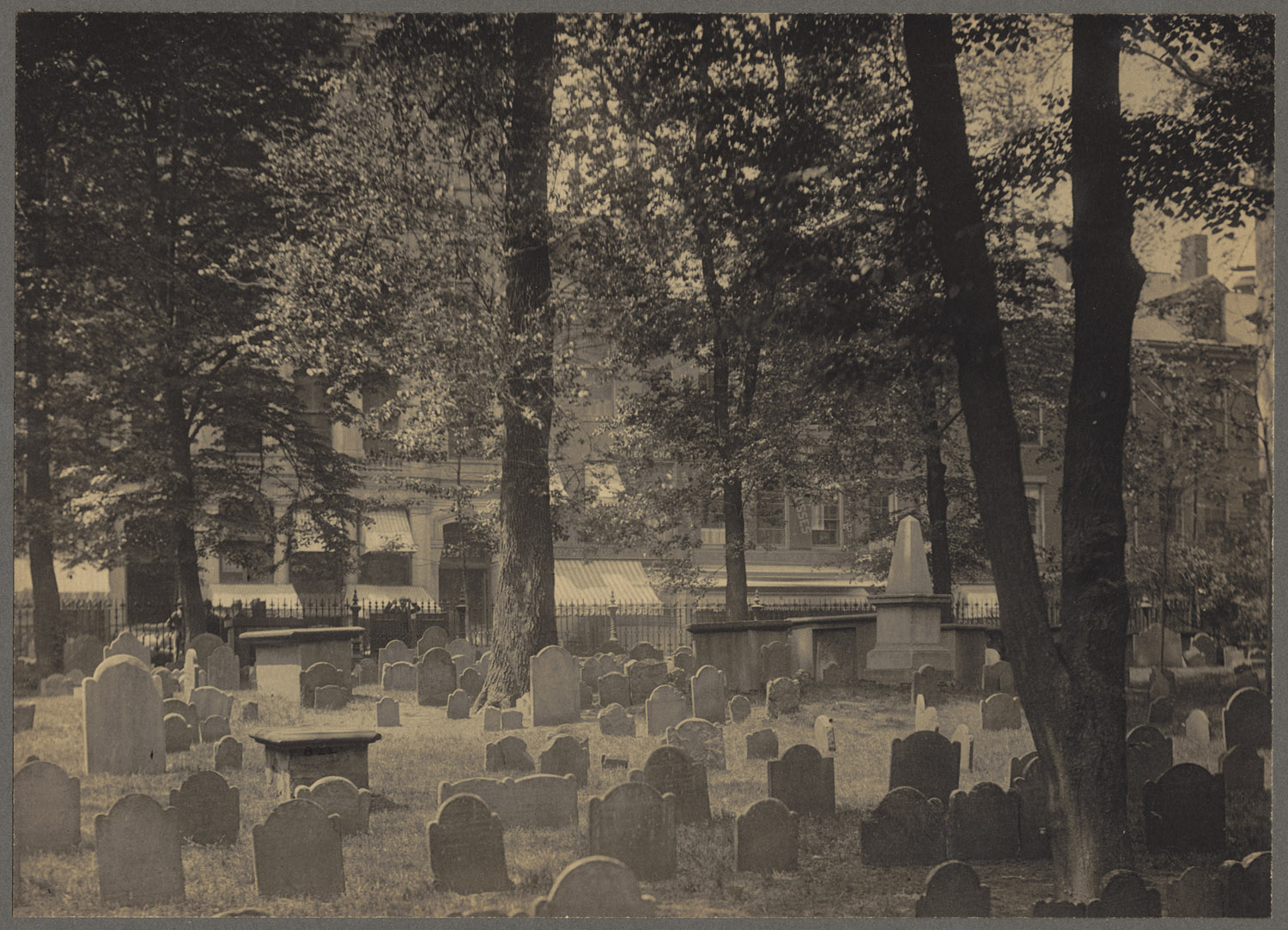
c. 1898, looking toward Tremont St.

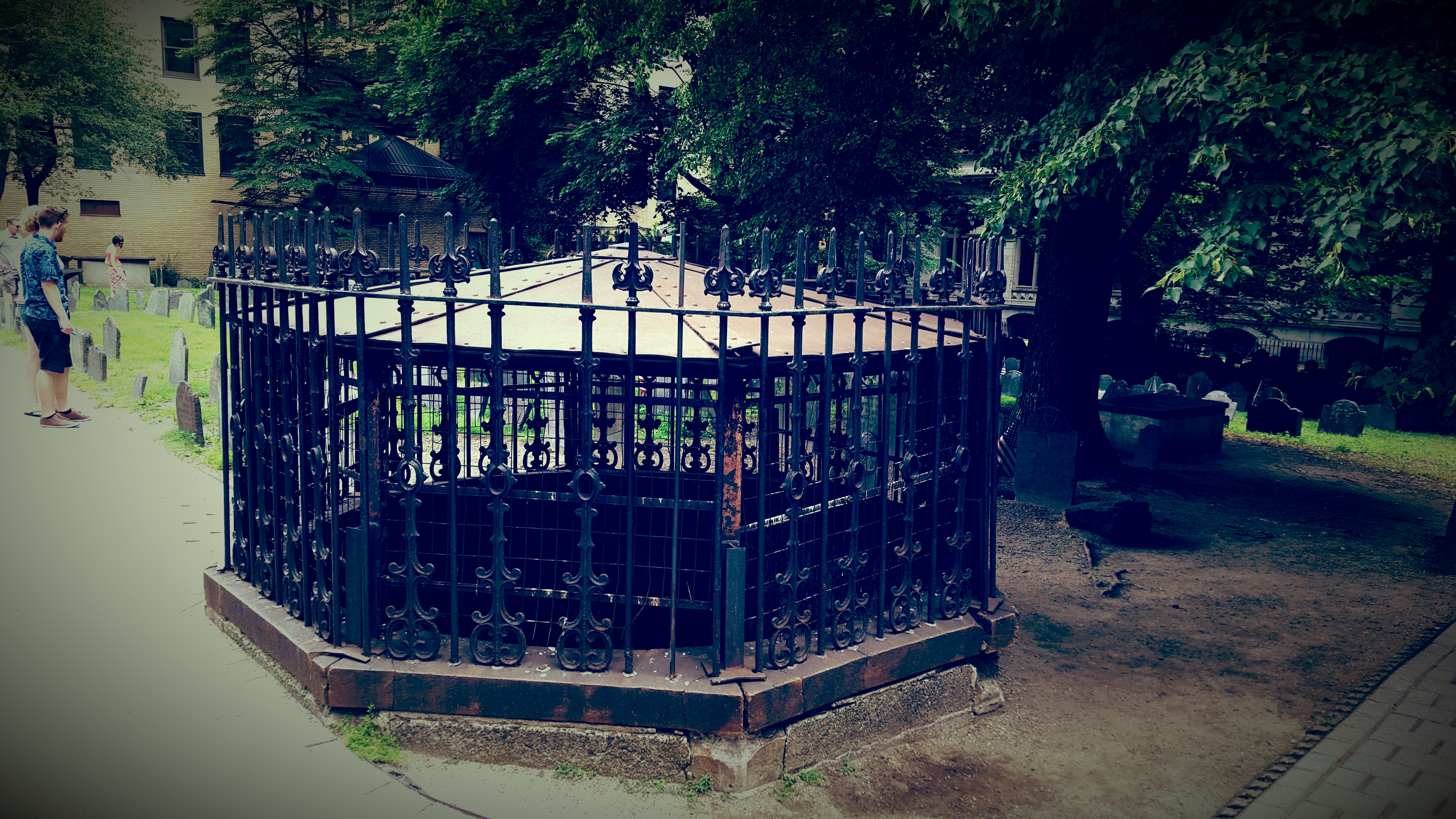
Ventilation shaft for the T, 2015

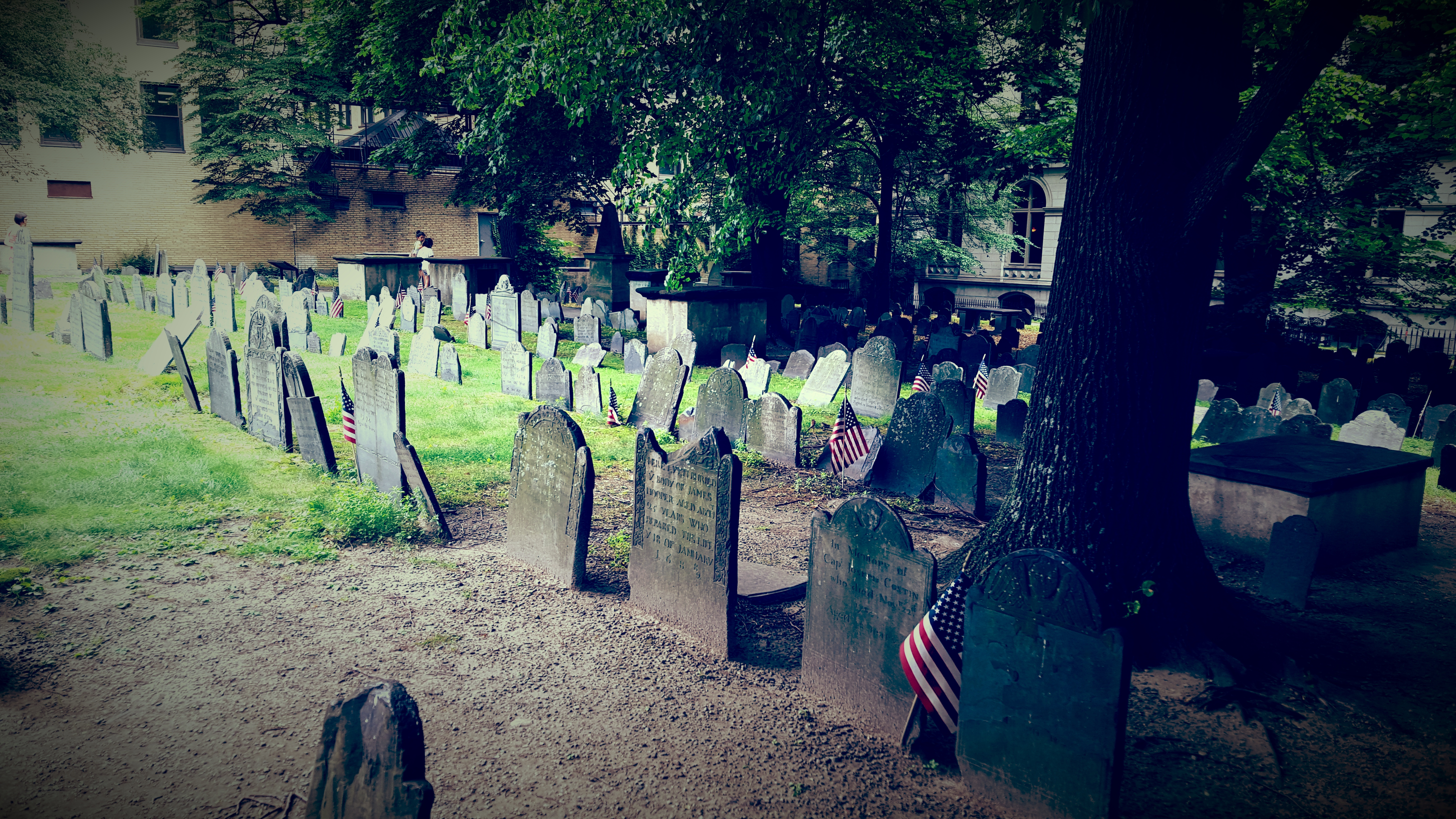
The Burying Ground in 2015

== See also ==
- List of cemeteries in Boston, Massachusetts

Preceded by King's Chapel	Locations along Boston's Freedom Trail; King's Chapel Burying Ground	Succeeded by site of the first public school, Boston Latin School
