= Roger Chillingworth =

Fictional character from the 1850 novel "The Scarlet Letter"

- First appearance: The Scarlet Letter
- Designed by: Nathaniel Hawthorne

In-universe information
- Occupation: Physician, alchemist
- Spouse: Hester Prynne
- Nationality: English

Roger Chillingworth is a fictional character and primary antagonist in the 1850 novel The Scarlet Letter by Nathaniel Hawthorne. He is an English scholar who moves to the New World after his wife, Hester Prynne.

== Fictional role ==
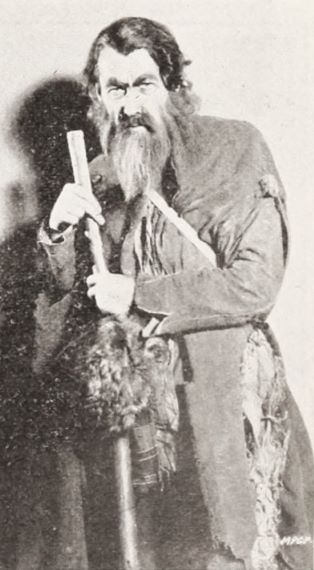
Chillgworth portrayed by Henry B. Walthall in a 1926 silent film adaptation

Chillingworth, a physician and student of alchemy, attempts to emigrate from England to Puritan Boston. He sends his wife ahead to set up in Boston, but he is delayed by problems at sea and then held captive by Indians. When he finally arrives in Boston, he finds his wife on a scaffold, being shamed for committing adultery. Meeting Hester in jail, Chillingworth presses her to divulge the name of her partner in adultery, but she refuses. Searching without her help, he eventually discovers that her lover is the town minister, Arthur Dimmesdale. Using his position as a doctor, and under the guise of treating Dimmesdale's unexplained sickness, Chillingworth manipulates Dimmesdale into insanity and suffering. Toward the end of the book, he tries to prevent Dimmesdale from confessing his sin publicly in order to force Dimmesdale to keep living with the emotional and spiritual suffering from the guilt of his unconfessed sin, but Dimmesdale confesses anyway, and dies shortly thereafter in Hester's arms. Chillingworth then also dies within a year because he no longer has a victim to harm.

== Portrayals ==
Chillingworth was portrayed by Henry B. Walthall in Victor Seastrom's 1926 film adaptation, starring Lillian Gish. He reprised the role opposite Colleen Moore in the 1934 adaptation. Chillingworth was played by Robert Duvall in the 1995 adaptation, starring Demi Moore.
