= Hester Prynne =

Protagonist of The Scarlet Letter

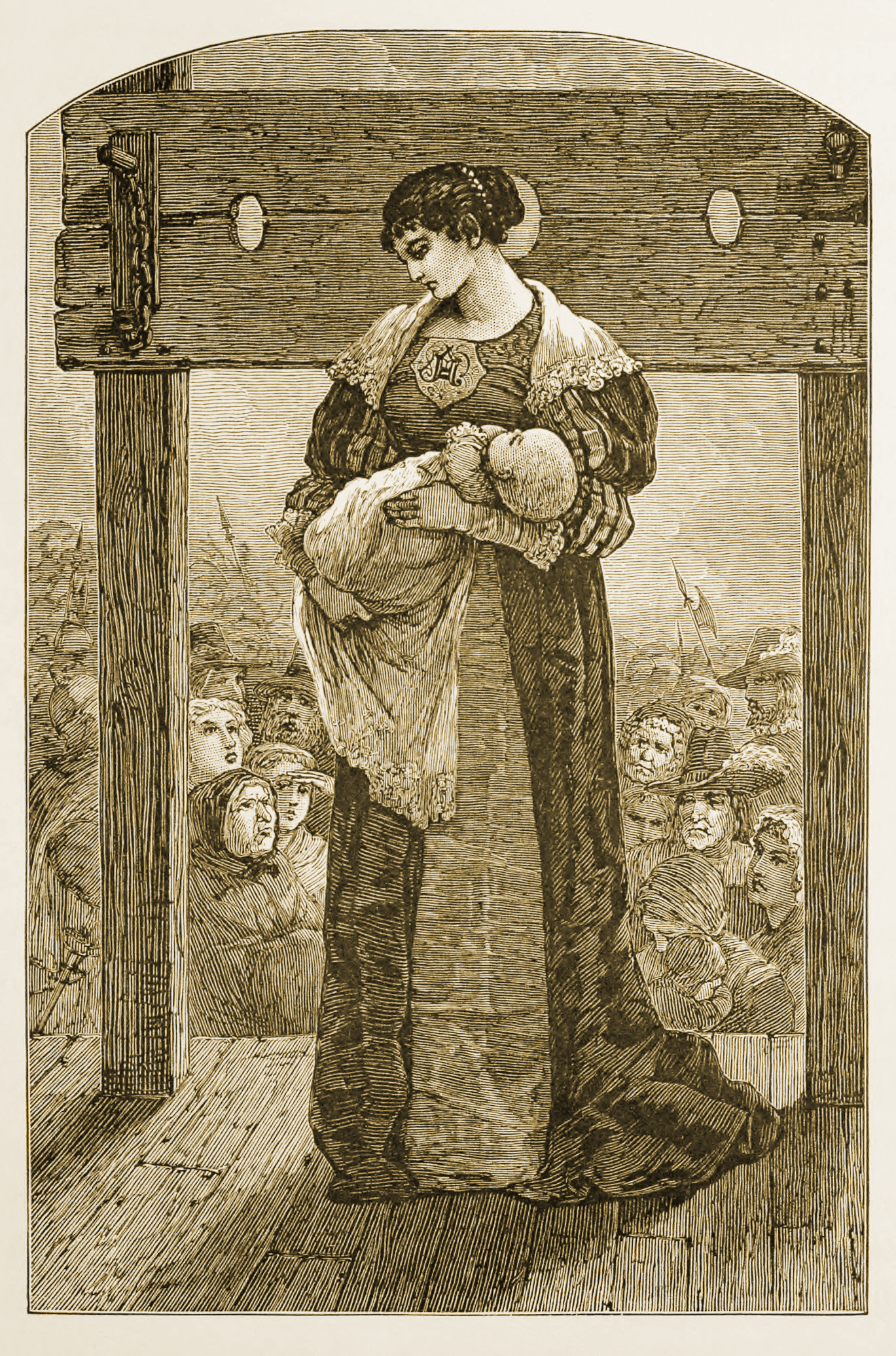
"Hester Prynne & Pearl before the stocks", an illustration by Mary Hallock Foote from an 1878 edition of The Scarlet Letter

Hester Prynne is the protagonist of Nathaniel Hawthorne's 1850 novel The Scarlet Letter. She is portrayed as a woman condemned by her Puritan neighbors for having a child out of wedlock. The character has been called "among the first and most important female protagonists in American literature".

== Fictional character overview ==
A resident of Colonial America, Hester has been sent ahead to the "New World" by her husband, who later assumes the name of Roger Chillingworth, as he has some business to finish before he can join her. After he is shipwrecked and captured by Native Americans and presumed dead, Hester continues to live her life as a seamstress in the town. She looks to the local pastor Arthur Dimmesdale for comfort; somewhere along the way passion emerges, culminating in the conception and subsequent birth of their child, Pearl. Because Hester has no husband with her, she is imprisoned for having a child out of wedlock, convicted of the crime of adultery, and sentenced to be forced to wear a prominent scarlet letter 'A' (standing for "adultery") for the rest of her life.

Though scorned by her fellow citizens, Hester continues to lead a relatively uneventful life. Shortly after the birth of the child and her punishment, Hester's husband reappears and demands that she tell him the name of the child's father. Hester refuses but swears not to reveal the fact that Chillingworth is her husband to the town folk. Hester continues living her life as a seamstress, providing for herself and her child.

Novelist John Updike said of Prynne:

She's such an arresting and slightly ambiguous figure. She's a funny mix of a truly liberated, defiantly sexual woman, but in the end a woman who accepts the penance that society imposed on her. And I don't know, I suppose she's an epitome of female predicaments. ... She is a mythic version of every woman's attempt to integrate her sexuality with societal demands.

One analyst wrote:

All the contradictions of Hester Prynne – guilt and honesty, sin and holiness, sex and chastity – make her an enduring heroine of American literature. She is flawed, complex, and above all fertile. The idea of Hester Prynne, the good woman gone bad, is a cultural meme that recurs again and again – perhaps because we as a culture are still trying to figure out who Hester really is and how we feel about her.

== Inspiration and influence ==
According to popular tradition, the gravestone of Elizabeth Pain in Boston's King's Chapel Burying Ground was the inspiration for Hester Prynne's grave. Scholar Laurie Rozakis has argued that an alternate or additional source for the story may be Hester Craford, a woman flogged for fornication with John Wedg. Another story claims that Hester was modeled after Mary Bachiler Turner (fourth wife of well-known Colonial minister Stephen Bachiler) whose life in colonial Maine bore a striking resemblance to Hester's tale. Boewe and Murphey (1960) posit that Hester Prynne is not based on any particular person but is a composite character based on elements and aspects of the lives of women in similar circumstances in the society. But Berson (2013) adds that there was no law requiring a scarlet letter.

Hawthorne carefully chose his characters' names, to convey symbolic meaning. Hester's given name is of Greek origin and means "star". Her surname Prynne connects her to the famous Puritan leader and pamphleteer, William Prynne. This anchors her to the strict community.

In various film adaptations of the novel, Prynne has been portrayed by actresses such as Lillian Gish, Meg Foster, Mary Martin, Sybil Thorndike, Senta Berger, and Demi Moore. In the cult television series Twin Peaks the name was also adopted as a pseudonym by the character Audrey Horne. Another literary figure using the surname Prynne is a woman who had an adulterous relationship with a pastor in the novel A Month of Sundays by John Updike, part of his trilogy of novels based on characters in The Scarlet Letter. In the musical The Music Man, Harold Hill refers to Hester Prynne in the song "Sadder but Wiser Girl". He sings that he wants a girl "with a touch of sin", remarking "I hope, and I pray, for a Hester to win just one more 'A'."
