= Social credit system =

Chinese state-run system for evaluating risk

- Simplified Chinese: 社会信用体系
- Traditional Chinese: 社會信用體系
Transcriptions
Standard Mandarin
- Hanyu Pinyin: shèhuì xìnyòng tǐxì
- Wade–Giles: she^{4}-hui^{4} hsin^{4}-yung^{4} t'i^{3}-hsi^{4}
- IPA: [ʂɤ̂.xwêɪ ɕîn.iʊ̂ŋ tʰì.ɕî]
Yue: Cantonese
- Yale Romanization: séh-wuí seun-yuhng tái-haih
- Jyutping: se5 wui2 seon3 jung6 tai2 hai6
- IPA: [sɛ˩˧ wuj˧˥ sɵn˧ iʊŋ˨ tʰɐj˧˥ hɐj˨]

The social credit system (Chinese: 社会信用体系; pinyin: shèhuì xìnyòng tǐxì) is a national credit rating and blacklist implemented by the government of the People's Republic of China. The social credit system is a broad governance strategy to track businesses, individuals, and government institutions and enhance their perceived trustworthiness rather than a single system. It is based on varying degrees of whitelisting (termed "redlisting" in China) and blacklisting. There have been widespread misconceptions in media reports about a unified social credit "score" based on individuals' behavior, leading to punishments if the score is too low or rewards if the score is high.

The origin of the concept can be traced back to the 1980s when the Chinese government attempted to develop a personal banking and financial credit rating system, especially for rural individuals and small businesses who lacked documented records. The program first emerged in the early 2000s, inspired by the credit scoring systems in other countries. The program initiated regional trials in 2009, before launching a national pilot with eight credit scoring firms in 2015. By 2023, most private social credit initiatives had been shut down by the PBOC, as the central government has been re-centralizing the score system.

The social credit system is an extension to the existing legal and financial credit rating system in China. Managed by the National Development and Reform Commission (NDRC), the People's Bank of China (PBOC) and the Supreme People's Court (SPC), the system was intended to standardize the credit rating function and perform financial and social assessment for businesses, government institutions, individuals and non-government organizations. The Chinese government's stated aim is to enhance trust in society with the system and regulate businesses in areas such as food safety, intellectual property, and financial fraud. Under the system, courts have an ability to impose penalties against judgment debtors, which are the primary form of restrictions imposed by the system.

== History ==
=== Background ===
The origin of the social credit system can be traced back to the early 1990s as part of attempts to develop personal banking and financial credit rating systems in China, and was inspired by Western commercial credit systems like FICO, Equifax, and TransUnion. The credit system aims to facilitate financial assessment in rural areas, where individuals and small business entities often lacked financial documents.

In 1999, businesswoman Huang Wenyun wrote a report following her negative experiences with domestic business trustworthiness and her research into credit management in the United States business environment. At the time, credit management and rating were largely unfamiliar concepts within the Chinese economy. Huang sent her report to Premier Zhu Rongji, who approved it and in August 1999 ordered the People's Bank of China to take immediate action. In September 1999, the Institute of Economics of the Chinese Academy of Social Sciences began a research project on establishing a national credit management system. Huang contributed more than RMB 300,000 to fund the research initiative and sponsored fieldwork in the United States and Europe. In the United States, the research group studied and prepared translations of 17 American credit reporting laws, including the Fair Credit Reporting Act.

In January 2000, the research group from the Chinese Academy of Social Sciences compiled their research into a text titled National Credit Management System. Among these academics was Lin Junyue, who became an important intellectual figure in the development of social credit. Premier Zhu approved the text and instructed government figures from ten ministries and commissions to begin studying the creation of a social credit management system. In late January 2000, the State Council released an essay by Zhu in which Zhu stated that China must "vigorously rectify social credit." In March 2000, Zhu delivered the government's work report to the National People's Congress, in which Zhu talked about the need to rectify social credit in the context of supervision of financial institutions, fraud, tax evasion, and debt repayments.

=== 2002 to 2014 ===
In 2002, the construction of a social credit system was formally announced during the 16th National Congress of the Chinese Communist Party. The central government had not developed a specific vision for what a finished system might look like. Local governments were to develop pilot initiatives which could then guide the larger policy approach.

In 2003, the State Council stated that the basic framework and operational mechanisms for a social credit should be established within five years. Most of the goals in this period were missed, although the financial aspects of social credit developed much further than non-financial aspects.

Among the financial aspects of social credit which developed quickly was credit reporting. In March 2006, the People's Bank of China established the Credit Reference Center, which has information regarding financial credit worthiness and has established basic financial records for 990 million Chinese citizens as of 2019. Its records relate only to finance and does not have any blacklist mechanism.

In 2007, the Inter-Ministerial Joint Conference on the Establishment of the SCS was established, replacing the leading small group which had previously been the top policy organ for social credit issues. The initial blueprints of the social credit system were drafted in 2007 by government bodies. The social credit system also attempts to solve the moral vacuum problem, insufficient market supervision and income inequality generated by the rapid economic and social changes since the reform and opening up in 1978. As a result of these problems, trust issues emerged in Chinese society such as food safety scandals, labor law violations, intellectual property thefts and corruption. Among the purposes of social credit is promotion and moral education regarding personal integrity and honesty. The policy of the social credit system traces its origin from both policing and work management practices.

The government of modern China has maintained systems of paper records on individuals and households such as the dàng'àn (档案) and hùkǒu (户口) which officials might refer to, but these systems do not provide the same degree and rapidity of feedback and consequences for Chinese citizens as the integrated electronic system because of the much greater difficulty of aggregating paper records for rapid, robust analysis.

The social credit system also originated from grid-style social management, a policing strategy first implemented in select locations from 2001 and 2002 (during the administration of Chinese Communist Party General Secretary Jiang Zemin) in specific locations across mainland China. In 2002, the Jiang administration proposed a social credit system as part of the promotion of a "unified, open, competitive, and orderly modern market system." In its first phase, grid-style policing was a system for more effective communication between public security bureaus. Within a few years, the grid system was adapted for use in distributing social services. Grid management provided the authorities not only with greater situational awareness on the group level, but also enhanced the tracking and monitoring of individuals.

One focus of social credit is to build judicial credibility through more effective enforcement of court orders. In 2013, the Supreme People's Court (SPC) of China started a blacklist of debtors with roughly 32,000 names. The list has since been described as a first step towards a national Social Credit System by state-owned media. The SPC's blacklist is composed of Chinese citizens and companies that refuse to comply with court orders (typically court orders to pay a fine or to repay a loan) despite having the ability to do so. It is hosted online at the Supreme People's Court judgment defaulter blacklist portal, and the information is shared with Credit China and the National Enterprise Credit Information Publicity System. The SPC also began working with private companies. For example, Sesame Credit began deducting credit points from people who defaulted on court fines.

Although there was institutional enthusiasm for a social credit system during the 2004 to 2014 period, implementation was adversely impacted by planning difficulties stemming from the relationship between credit reporting initiatives (which were defined narrowly) and regulatory objectives (which were more vaguely defined). A lack of central coordination resulted in institutional bottlenecks.

=== 2014 to 2020 ===
The State Council sought to accelerate the development of social credit and, in 2014, issued the Planning Outline for the Construction of a Social Credit System (2014-2020). The Planning Outline was a major step in China's approach to developing a social credit system; before the 2014 Planning Outline, there had been only one high-level policy document (issued in 2007). Since the Planning Outline, the State Council has issued new guidance annually.

The Planning Outline focused primarily on economic activity in commerce, government affairs, social integrity, and judicial credibility. It set broad goals intended to be reached by 2020:

1. a reward and punishment mechanism should be fully effective,
2. a basic credit investigation that covers the whole of society should be established,
3. credit oversight mechanisms should be established,
4. credit service markets should be performing well, and
5. fundamental social credit laws, regulations, and standards should be established.

In 2015, the People's Bank of China licensed eight companies to begin a trial of social credit systems. Among these eight firms is Sesame Credit (owned by Alibaba Group and operated by Ant Financial), Tencent, and China's biggest ride-sharing and online-dating services, Didi Chuxing and Baihe.com, respectively. In general, multiple firms collaborated with the government to develop the software and algorithms used to calculate credit. Commercial pilot programs developed by private Chinese conglomerates that have the authorization from the state to test out social credit experiments. The pilots are more widespread than their local government counterparts but function on a voluntary basis: citizens can decide to opt-out of these systems at any time on request. Users with good scores are offered advantages such as easier access to credit loans, discounts for car and bike sharing services, fast-tracked visa applications, free health check-ups and preferential treatment at hospitals.

In 2016, the State Council encouraged market entities to provide preferential treatment to those with outstanding financial credit records and differentiated services to those with seriously untrustworthy records.

The Chinese central government originally considered having the social credit system be run by a private firm, but by 2017, it acknowledged the need for third-party administration. However, no licenses to private companies were granted. By mid-2017, the Chinese government had decided that none of the pilot programs would receive authorization to be official credit reporting systems. The reasons include conflict of interest, the remaining control of the government, as well as the lack of cooperation in data sharing among the firms that participate in the development. However, the social credit system's operation by a seemingly external association, such as a formal collaboration between private firms, has not been ruled out yet. In November 2017, Sesame Credit denied that Sesame Credit data was shared with the Chinese government. In 2017, the People's Bank of China issued a jointly owned license to Baihang Credit valid for three years. Baihang Credit is co-owned by the National Internet Finance Association (36%) and the eight other companies (8% each), allowing the state to maintain control and oversee the creation of new commercial pilot programs. As of mid-2018, only pilot schemes had been tested without any official implementation.

Private companies have also signed contracts with provincial governments to set up the basic infrastructure for the social credit system at the provincial level. As of March 2017, 137 commercial credit reporting companies were active on the Chinese market. As part of the development of the social credit system, the Chinese government has been monitoring the progress of third-party Chinese credit rating systems. Ultimately, Chinese government dropped the support for privately developed credit rating system, and these pilot projects remained as corporate loyalty programs.

In December 2017 the National Development and Reform Commission and People's Bank of China selected "model cities" that demonstrated the steps needed to make a functional and efficient implementation of the social credit system. Among them are: Hangzhou, Nanjing, Xiamen, Chengdu, Suzhou, Suqian, Huizhou, Wenzhou, Weihai, Weifang, Yiwu and Rongcheng. These pilots were deemed successful in their handling of "blacklists and 'redlists'", their creation of "credit sharing platforms" and their "data sharing efforts with the other cities".

By 2018, some restrictions had been placed on citizens which state-owned media described as the first step toward creating a nationwide social credit system.

According to Antonia Hmaidi of the think tank Mercator Institute for China Studies (MERICS), the local government social credit system experiments are focused more on the construction of transparent rule-based systems, in contrast with the rating systems used in the commercial pilots. Citizens often begin with an initial score, to which points are added or deducted depending on their actions. The specific number of points for each action are often listed in publicly available catalogs. Cities also experimented with a multi-level system, in which districts decide on scorekeepers who are responsible for reporting scores to higher-ups. Some experiments also allowed citizens to appeal the scores they were attributed.

In 2019, the central government expressed "unhappiness" at the pilot cities that were experimenting with social credit scores and issued guidelines that no citizens can be punished for having low scores, and instead punishment can only be for legally defined crimes and civil infractions, consequently leading to pilot cities either changing their programs to be encouragement-only or not materializing at all. According to a February 2022 report by MERICS, "In reality, the SoCS is not the techno-dystopian nightmare we fear: it is lowly digitalized, highly fragmented, and primarily focuses on businesses. Most importantly, such a score simply does not exist."

In July 2019, an NDRC spokesperson stated that at a press conference that "personal credit scores can be combined with incentives for trustworthiness, but cannot be used for punishments". The Hong Kong Government stated in July 2019 that claims that the social credit system will be rolled out in Hong Kong are "totally unfounded" and stated that the system will not be implemented there.

In 2019, high-level NDRC officials stated that over 10% of people blacklisted for their commission of tax fraud had repaid their taxes, that the bad credit rate had decreased by 22.7%, and that the proportion of companies blacklisted had decreased. In the view of these officials, these were "remarkable results."

=== 2020 to present ===
In 2020, the Supreme People's Court announced that a nationwide total of 7.51 million blacklisted judgment defaulters had fulfilled their legal obligations and been removed from the judgment defaulter blacklist, accounting for half of the blacklisted judgment defaulters as of that date.

As a result of the COVID-19 pandemic, various aspects of social credit were modified. On February 1, 2020, the People's Bank of China announced it would temporarily suspend the inclusion of mortgage and credit card payments in the credit record of people impacted by the pandemic. Private financial credit scoring companies, including Sesame Credit, suspended financial credit ratings. Various cities established mechanisms to incentivize companies to provide pandemic relief, with measures including redlisting for those donating funds and supplies with benefits like simplified administrative procedures, increased policy support, or increased financial support. On the enforcement side of social credit, provinces and cities promulgated regulations emphasizing heavy penalties for price hikes, violence against doctors, counterfeit medical supplies, refusal to comply with pandemic prevention measures, and wildlife trade violations.

In 2020, the rights protection metrics in the NDRC's City Credit Status Monitoring and Early Warning Indicators emphasized that cities must establish transparent credit repair procedures handled within an appropriate timeframe. It also emphasized that cities should prevent the over generalization of the concept of credit, stating that individual behavior such as petitioning the government, unpaid property fees, running red lights (among other listed examples) must not be included in a person's credit record.

The State Council issued its Guiding Opinions on Further Improving Systems for Restraining the Untrustworthy and Building Mechanisms for Building Credit Worthiness that have Long-term Effect in November 2020. The central message of the Guiding Opinions was that new blacklists should not be created on an ad hoc basis and that social credit should not be applied in policy areas without sufficient consensus. It stated that credit repair processes must be improved, that blacklists must only be used in instances of severe harm, and that information security and privacy should be prioritized.

In November 2021, the United Nations Education, Scientific, and Cultural Organization (UNESCO) adopted a Recommendation on the Ethics of AI. Among its recommendations is that "AI systems should not be used for social scoring or mass surveillance purposes." China is a signatory of the document.

Following their submission for public comment, China in December 2021 issued the National List of Basic Penalty Measures for Untrustworthiness and the National Directory of Public Credit Information. The National Directory establishes limitations on what types of credit information can be collected or used as a basis for social credit penalties or rewards. It describes three categories of data:

1. information that is appropriate for consideration,
2. information on violations that can be considered only when the circumstances of the violation are severe, and
3. information that can never be included as part of social credit.

Appropriate information for consideration includes information on the execution of judicial judgments, administrative violations, among other material, and positive recognition for trustworthy behavior. Information appropriate only when the circumstances of the violation are severe include small payment arrears or public transportation fare evasion. The National Directory bans the consideration of private information like religious preferences or government petitioning activity.

The December 2021 National List's purpose is to further standardize penalty measures. It specifies that administrative bodies cannot extent penalties beyond those provided in national level law and regulation. In a 2022 directive, the State Council stated that it will "actively explore innovative ways to use the credit concept and methods to solve difficulties, bottlenecks, and painful points that restrict the country's economic and social activities." On 14 November 2022, the NDRC issued a draft Law on the Establishment of the Social Credit System. According to academic Vincent Brussee, the draft "was deeply unsatisfactory to SCS observers worldwide. It did not stipulate anything not already regulated in one of the many recent documents on the system. The draft just copy-pasted bits from those." Academic Haiqing Yu writes that "the draft law is a patchwork of existing policies and regulations that prioritise unification rather than clarification."

As of 2022, over 62 different social credit system pilot programs were implemented by local governments. The pilot programs began following the release of the 2014 "Planning Outline for the Construction of a Social Credit System" by Chinese authorities. The government oversees the creation and development of these governmental pilots by requesting they each publish a regular "interdepartmental agreement on joint enforcement of rewards and punishments for 'trustworthy' and 'untrustworthy' conduct."

Though some reports stated social credit would be powered by artificial intelligence (AI), as of 2023 penalty decisions were made by humans, not AI, and digitization remained limited. Credit systems for local government remained undeveloped and resemble incentivized loyalty programs like those run by airlines. Participation is fully voluntary and there are no enticement beyond losing access to minor rewards. For fear of overreach and pushback, the Chinese central government banned punishments for low scores and minor offences. During the city trials, pilot programs only saw limited participation. Many people living in pilot program cities are unaware of the programs. In Xiamen, 210,059 users activated their social credit account, roughly 5% of the population of Xiamen; 60,000 or 1.5% of population in Wuhu participated the system; Hangzhou has 1,872,316 (15%) participants and fewer regularly use the system. Scores are not shared between cities as the scoring criteria and mechanisms are different.

By 2023, most private social credit initiatives had been shut down by the People's Bank of China, and regulations had cracked down on most local scoring pilot programs, as the central government has been re-centralizing the score system.

== Organization ==
Social credit in China is a broad policy category seeking to enforce legal obligations including laws, regulations, and contracts. This approach views financial credit and legal compliance as measures of trustworthiness. Social credit does not itself bring new restrictions; it focuses on increasing implementation of existing restrictions. China's governmental approaches to social credit are described by various sets of documents issued by different institutions. There is no integrated system, nor a comprehensive document setting out a unified approach. Generally, the different approaches to social credit are united by the theme of increasing digitization, data collection, and data centralization.

There is no unified, numerical credit score for businesses or individuals, rather national and local platforms use different evaluation or rating systems. Due to the differences in various pilot programs and a fragment system structure, information regarding the scoring mechanism is often conflicting. Inspired by FICO, a numerical social credit score calculated by individual behavior and activities was given to citizens in certain pilot programs developed by financial firms or localized initiatives. However, these practices were not widespread applications and eventually, the numerical score mechanism was limited to private credit rating and loyalty programs. Private involvements were ultimately abandoned by the government.

The system includes sanctions for the offenders; unlike in the past where the offenders were punished by one supervising agency or court, they now face sanctions from multiple agencies, greatly increasing their effect. Though the sanctions are severe, they affect a small part of companies and individuals. By publicizing these punishments and blacklists through state-media and through other agencies, the system is aimed to create a deterrence effect.

Social credit is an example of China's "top-level design" approach. It is coordinated by the Central Comprehensively Deepening Reforms Commission. Social credit when referred by the Chinese government, generally covers two different concepts. The first is "traditional financial creditworthiness" where it documents the financial history of individuals and companies and score them on how well they are able to pay off future loans. The second concept is "social creditworthiness" where the government is stating that there needs to be higher "trust in society". And to build such trust, the government had proposed to combat corruption, scammers, tax evasion, counterfeiting of goods, false advertising, pollution and other problematic issues, and to create the mechanisms to keep individuals and companies accountable for such transgressions.

=== Conceptualization ===
The blueprint document, the 2014 Planning Outline, set four target areas for the Social credit system. Social credit system projects in these four areas are not interconnected, but relatively independent from each other with their own jurisdictions, rules and logic.

Business trustworthiness system (商务诚信体系)
Blacklist system for discredited business organizations. This system is regulated by People's Bank of China financial credit-rating system and commercial credit-rating system.
Government trustworthiness system (政务诚信体系)
Evaluation system targeting civil servants and government institutions.
Social trustworthiness system (社会诚信体系)
Blacklist system for discredited individuals.
Judiciary public trust system (司法公信体系)
Blacklist system for judgment defaulters. This system is regulated by Supreme People's Court.

As of 2023, the government has only created a system that is primarily focused on assessing businesses rather than on individuals, and consists of a database that collects the data on corporate regulation compliance from a number of government agencies. Kendra Schaefer, head of tech policy research at the Beijing-based consultancy firm Trivium China, had described the system in a report for the US government's US-China Economic and Security Review Commission, as being "roughly equivalent to the IRS, FBI, EPA, USDA, FDA, HHS, HUD, Department of Energy, Department of Education, and every courthouse, police station, and major utility company in the US sharing regulatory records across a single platform". The database can be openly accessed by any Chinese citizen on the newly created website called "Credit China". Its database also includes random information like a list of approved robot building companies, hospitals that have committed insurance fraud, universities that are deemed legitimate and a list of individuals who have defaulted on a court judgement.

== Social credit mechanisms in practice ==
Social credit does not itself bring new restrictions; it focuses on increasing implementation of existing restrictions. Although the Chinese government announced in 2014 that it would implement a nationwide social credit system by 2020, as of 2023 no full-fledged system exists.

Implementation of social credit is primarily focused on marketplace behavior. As of 2023, about 1% of companies and 0.3% of individuals receive social credit-related penalties per year.

=== Financial credit reporting ===
National financial credit reporting for businesses and individuals is provided by the People's Bank of China, which does not assign any numerical scoring.

=== Red Lists ===
Red Listing practices seek to incentivize exemplary personal behavior or business compliance. Red List practices vary significantly and there are no top-level regulations or guidance addressing red lists in detail. The most common benefit to red listed companies include reduced administrative burdens or simplified procedures. Part of the government logic for red listing companies is that it facilitates regulators' ability to focus on companies with a worse compliance record. Red Listed individuals may receive benefits like parking and public transit discounts or discount tourist site tickets.

=== Blacklists ===
Blacklisting is based on specific instances of misconduct, not any numerical score. The Central Government operates a number of national and regional blacklists based on various types of violations. The court system is available for businesses, organizations and individuals to appeal their violations. As of 2019, it typically took 2–5 years to be removed from the blacklist, but early removal is also possible if the blacklisted person "fulfills legal obligations or remedies". In 2019, approximately 17,400 individuals had been blacklisted. As of September 2025, approximately 200,000 additional individuals were blacklisted in 2025, 46 percent due to contractual disputes.

Three main types of blacklists exist: the judgment defaulter blacklist, sectoral blacklists, and no-fly/no-ride lists.

Before being added to a blacklist, a person or company must be informed of the decision and the legal basis for it. Blacklists may be publicized, although as of at least 2023 there is no uniform method for doing so. Some blacklist portals can be searched online while others are uploaded as PDFs or image files. Blacklisted parties are sometimes displayed in public settings, including on the Internet, in newspapers, or television.

==== Judgment defaulter blacklist ====
Before 2013, the process of obtaining court-ordered enforcement against judgment debtors was fragmented. In 2013, the Supreme People's Court issued the Several Provisions on Announcement of the Judgment Defaulter Blacklist which became the foundational regulation for the judgment defaulter blacklist. It stated that to be included on the list, a defaulter must be capable of complying with the court orders, but actively avoids doing so. Based on the idea that judgment defaulters should repay their debts before purchasing luxuries, once added to the list, judgment defaulters are restricted from:

- travelling via plane, high speed train, or first class non-high speed train,
- staying at star-rated hotels or golf courses,
- purchasing real estate,
- leasing "high-grade" office buildings, hotels, or apartments,
- purchasing "non-business essential" vehicles,
- holiday trips,
- sending children to high fee private schools,
- purchasing high-premium insurance products, and
- "other non-life and non-work essential consumption behavior."

In certain test programs, public humiliation is used as a mechanism to deter sanctioned individuals but mainly targets trust-breaking legal persons. Mugshots of blacklisted individuals are sometimes displayed on large LED screens on buildings or shown before the movie in movie theaters. Certain personal information of the blacklisted people is deliberately made accessible to the public and is displayed online as well as at various public venues such as movie theaters and buses. In 2019, a Hebei court released an app showing a "map of deadbeat debtors" within 500 meters and encouraged users to report individuals who they believed could repay their debts. According to China Daily, a spokesman of the court stated that "it's a part of our measures to enforce our rulings and create a socially credible environment."

The Supreme People's Court's blacklist is one of its most important enforcement tools and its use has resulted in the recovery of tens of trillions of RMB for fines and delinquent repayments as of 2023. Chinese founders are increasingly placed on the national debtor blacklist by venture capitalists seeking a return of invested funds. Restrictions associated with the social credit system are "almost entirely restricted to the court judgment defaulter list", according to Jeremy Daum of Yale University, who adds that the judgment defaulter blacklist is "so distinct from other social credit blacklists, however, that it is probably best to understand the defaulter list solely as a court enforcement mechanism rather than thinking of it as 'social credit' at all".

==== Sectoral blacklists ====
Many sectoral blacklists exist and are managed by a variety of regulatory and administrative bodies. Primarily, the penalties for being included on these blacklists are discretionary restrictions in administrative processes and interactions with the government. For example, regulators may exclude a company on a sectoral blacklist from participating in public procurement, revoke government funding or subsidies, cancel permits or revoke qualifications or certifications, or restrict the issuance of corporate bonds. Penalties cannot be developed ad hoc and must instead be based in national level law and regulation. Penalties from inclusion on sectoral blacklists may be imposed both on the violating company as well as legal representatives, senior company management, and the staff directly responsible for the violation that placed the company on the blacklist. Multiple government bodies may impose restrictions as a result of a person or company's inclusion on a sectoral blacklist. The availability of sectoral blacklist with the public also means that potential business partners may act accordingly and decline to deal with a blacklisted company.

==== No-fly and no-ride lists ====
Inclusion on the no-ride list or no-fly list results from specific instances of misconduct on trains or planes. The no-fly list is administered by Civil Aviation Administration of China. The no-ride list is administered by the National Railway Administration. Misconduct resulting in inclusion on the no-ride or no fly lists can include violation of safety regulations, harassing other passengers or transportation workers, smoking, scalping tickets, or using counterfeit tickets. Inclusion on the list prohibits a person from buying new tickets for a designated time period, usually six to twelve months. This is the only penalty under the no-ride or no-fly list, and inclusion on these blacklists has no impact in other areas of life or business.

By May 2018, several million flight and high-speed train trips had been denied to people who had been blacklisted either through misbehavior on planes or trains, or failing to follow a court-ordered judgement. As of June 2019, according to the National Development and Reform Commission of China, 26.82 million air tickets as well as 5.96 million high-speed rail tickets had been denied to people who were deemed "untrustworthy" (失信) (on a blacklist) and 4.37 million blacklisted people had chosen to fulfill their duties required by the law, such as repaying court-ordered judgements before being allowed to travel on high-speed rail and planes. In July 2019, additional 2.56 million flight tickets as well as 90 thousand high-speed train tickets were denied to those on the blacklist.

==== Procedures for removal from blacklists ====
After a blacklist decision becomes effective, the blacklisted party can file for credit repair. Through the credit repair process, a violator corrects the impact of the underlying violation and commits to abide by laws and regulations in the future. Companies undergoing credit repair typically must supply evidence that they have corrected their violations. Companies may also have to agree to a credit pledge in which they commit to upholding laws and regulations, commit to abiding by contracts, and agree to be subject to more severe penalties for any future violations. If authorities approve of the request for credit repair, the violator is removed from the blacklist and penalties are ended.

=== Credibility-based regulation ===
Even though scores and assessments so far play a rather limited role in the social credit system, with binary blacklists and red lists being most influential, first steps were taken to create numerical assessments of trustworthiness of all social credit subjects (社会信用评价). Several local regulatory agencies have implemented central-level plans to build a credibility-based regulation mechanism ("以信用为基础的新型监管机制"). The SCS Building Law draft defines credibility-based regulation as "departments that have regulatory duties in accordance with the law, rationally and reasonably assessing the credibility status of regulatory subjects based on their credibility records and credibility appraisals and carrying out hierarchical and categorized regulation on this basis". Art. 7, A key implementation link for this, beyond local policy documents, are technical standards.

=== Social Credit System subjects ===
The target subjects of social credit system practices are in policy language often referred to as "social credit subjects 社会信用主体" or "credit information subjects (xinyong xinxi zhuti 信⽤信息主体)". They include the following actors.

==== For companies ====
The social credit system is meant to provide an answer to the problem of lack of trust on the Chinese market. As of 2020, the corporate regulation function of the system appears to be more advanced than other parts of the system and the "Corporate Social Credit System" has been the primary focus of government attention. As of 2020, over 73.3% of enforcement actions since 2014 have been targeted toward companies, the largest part of all enforcements, while around 1-2% of all companies were sanctioned by the system annually.

For businesses, the social credit system is meant to serve as a market regulation mechanism. The goal is to establish a self-enforcing regulatory regime fueled by big data in which businesses exercise "self-restraint" (企业自我约束). The basic idea is that with a functional credit system in place, companies will comply with government policies and regulations to avoid having their scores lowered by disgruntled employees, customers or clients. For example, the central government can use social credit data to offer risk-assessed grants and loans to small and medium enterprises (SMEs), encouraging banks to offer greater loan access for SMEs.

As currently envisioned, companies with good credit scores will enjoy benefits such as good credit conditions, lower tax rates, less custom checks, and more investment opportunities. Companies with bad credit scores will potentially face unfavorable conditions for new loans, higher tax rates, investment restrictions and lower chances to participate in publicly funded projects. Government plans also envision real-time monitoring of a business's activities. In that case, infractions on the part of a business could result in a lower score almost instantly. However, whether this will actually happen depends on the future implementation of the system as well as on the availability of technology needed for this kind of monitoring.

To improve credit score, companies need to conform to the government rules, such as following the COVID-19 containment guidelines.

==== For government institutions ====
Government institutions receive the second highest number of enforcement actions, accounting for 13.3% of the penalties as of 2020, while less than 0.1% of all government entities were sanctioned by the system annually. The social credit system targets government agencies, assesses local governments' performance and focuses on financial problems such as local governments' debts and contract defaults. The Central Government hopes the system can improve "government self-discipline." Local governments are also encouraged and rewarded by the social credit system if they successfully implement and follow the orders from the central government.

==== For individuals ====
As of 2020, individuals receive 10.3% of all enforcement actions, affecting around 0.15% to 0.3% of the national population annually. The dealing of the social credit system with individuals focuses on the financial trustworthiness of individual citizens. The dealing of the system with individuals is primarily focused on debt repayment, though major violations of the law have also been sanctioned. One major focus is that of the debt-dodger (laolai), a phrase which refers to those who can pay their debts but choose not to. A laolai blacklist is maintained by the Supreme People's Court.

In addition to dishonest and fraudulent financial behavior, there have been proposals in some cities to officially list several behaviors as negative factors of credit ratings, including playing loud music or eating in rapid transits, violating traffic rules such as jaywalking and red-light violations, making reservations at restaurants or hotels, but not showing up, failing to correctly sort personal waste, fraudulently using other people's public transportation ID cards, etc.; on the other hand, including behavior listed as positive factors of credit ratings such as donating blood, donating to charity, volunteering for community services, praising government efforts on social media and so on. However, due to the system mainly relying on digitized administrative documents, early efforts to integrate behavioral data into the system were mainly discarded.

According to Sarah Cook of Freedom House in 2019, city-level pilot projects for the social credit system have included rewarding individuals for aiding authorities in enforcing restrictions of religious practices, including coercing practitioners of Falun Gong to renounce their beliefs and reporting on Uyghurs who publicly pray, fast during Ramadan or perform other Islamic practices. In an October 2022 study, professors from Princeton University, Freie Universität Berlin and Pennsylvania State University also found that "repressing protesters, petitioners, journalists, and political activists via the SCS is common among Chinese localities."

==== For social organizations ====
As of 2020, non-government organizations receive 3.3% of all enforcement actions. Although the enforcement remain a small group in numerical terms, but their inclusion has an important implication as it affects foreign NGOs operated within China.

=== Examples of local scoring systems ===
Most initiatives under the social credit system do not involve actual numerical scores; instead, documentation of specific offenses is recorded in one's credit profile, the exception being the trial programs launched by some cities and rural communities. These programs vary greatly from city to city, and participation is voluntary. Local credit profiles are hardly shared between cities.

Since the early 2010s, several cities in China launched pilot programs to test and develop a potential social credit system. Some of these programs assigned scores to individuals, but many of the scoring programs faced criticism. The main criticism of these pilot programs came from Chinese state media, which denounced these practices as having unfairly restricted legal rights or tracked personal behaviors that were completely unrelated to the concept of "credit." In 2019, the Chinese government reinforced this criticism by issuing clear guidelines to prevent misuse, explicitly stating that "scores" can not be used to punish citizens. As a result, many pilot programs were discontinued, while some pilot cities revised their programs. Examples were Wenzhou, which abandoned their initial program and, in 2019, revised it to be an "encouragement-only scheme". Another was Rongcheng, which changed their pilot program in 2021, so that it was strictly voluntary and can only issue rewards. According to a 2022 article from the Mercator Institute for China Studies (MERICS), the only social credit system programs that continue to have "personal scores" of individuals are strictly for issuing positive incentives only. Under some policies, higher scores can earn a participant cheaper public transportation, shorter security lines in subways, or tax reductions.

Non-comprehensive examples of city trial policies
Stage	Type	Introduction	Policy
City trials	Social	2016	Starting 1 May 2016, Shanghai elderly residents may sue their children or other family members if the latter do not regularly visit the elderly and the courts in Shanghai may rule that the children or other family members must visit the elderly and, if rejected, the children or relevant family members will be blacklisted.
City trials	Social	2019	Beijing government officially announced that it will start to explore and test a "Personal Credit Score."
City trials	Social	2019	In Beijing, inappropriate behavior in rapid transit systems, including playing loud music or eating (except for infants and sick people), could result in a negative record in local credit profiles.
City trials	Social	2018	In selected intersections of Beijing and Shenzhen, personal information of traffic violators is publicly displayed on the screens at traffic crosses and red-light violations may be recorded in credit profiles in the future.
City trials	Social	2019	Starting 1 August 2019, Guangzhou residents who cheat in national, provincial or municipal examinations will receive a negative record in their credit profiles.; Starting 1 August 2019, Guangzhou residents who fraudulently use other people's public-transportation identification cards or fake ID cards or occupy the seats of others, may receive a negative record in their credit profiles.
City trials	Social	2018–2019	Starting 1 November 2019, Shenzhen residents, who are at least 14 years old, who violate traffic rules such as jaywalking and crossing at a red light, once caught, will receive a negative record in their credit profiles. For residents under the age of 14 who violate traffic rules, their legal guardians will need to take educational courses or complete certain social services, otherwise the traffic violation will be recorded in their credit profiles.; In Shenzhen, traffic violations of motor vehicle or moped drivers, such as inappropriate use of high beam and drunk driving, may be recorded in the credit profiles of the drivers; if the driver receives a traffic fine 5 times or more in a year or has 3 unresolved violations or more in a year, they will receive a negative record in their profile.
City trials	Social	2019	Starting 1 August 2019, individuals and organizations in Hangzhou who do not comply with the waste sorting rules of the city will receive a negative record in their credit profiles and will have to pay a corresponding amount of fine.
City trials	Social	2019	Starting 8 July 2019, moped drivers and pedestrians who make 5 or more traffic violations (including red-light violations) in a year will receive a negative record in their credit profiles in Nanjing. In some places, personal information of traffic violators is publicly displayed on the screens at traffic crosses.
City trials	Social	2016	Starting in 2016, Suzhou city launched "Osmanthus score". 25 types of residents' behavior will cost a drop in their credit scores, including cheating in online video games, making reservations at hotels or restaurants, but not showing up, failing to pay cellphone bills promptly, failing to pick up take-out foods ordered, etc. On the other hand, making blood donations or doing volunteer work may boost one's credit score.
City trials	Social	2017	Jinan city launched penalty point system for dog regulation. Starting from 1 January 2017, dog owners lose three points for keeping their dogs off leash in public places, allowing their dogs to disturb other people, not cleaning up after their dogs, etc. Owners lose another three points on the second offense. They lose all 12 points for the third time and are banned from owning a dog for a period of 5 years; owners also lose all 12 points immediately if their dogs are found unregistered with the government or faulting annual review. Dogs of owners with zero points are confiscated by the government until the owner takes free courses on relevant city rules and passes corresponding exams.; Shanghai Police Department intended to establish a point system in 2019 for dog owner offense, which is linked to the owners' overall credit profiles.
City trials	Business	2018	In November 2018, a detailed plan was produced for further implementation of the program for 2018–2020 in Beijing. The plans included blacklisting people from public transport and publicly disclosing individuals' and businesses' untrustworthiness ratings.

== Public opinion ==
Chinese academics have produced a substantial body of work analyzing social credit in China. As of 2023, the large majority of Chinese scholarships accept the legitimacy of social credit as a whole, although there are also criticisms of different approaches or implementation efforts. In several instances, academics' criticisms of social credit have been adopted and re-issued by state media outlets, including Xinhua and People's Daily.

=== Approval ===
A series of studies have concluded that social credit is well-received domestically. In a 2018 study, 80% of respondents either strongly approved or approved of China's social credit system, while one percent disapproved. The study was conducted by Professor Genia Kostka of Free University of Berlin and was based on a cross-regional Internet survey of 2,209 Chinese citizens of various backgrounds. The study found "a surprisingly high degree of approval of SCSs across respondent groups" and that "more socially advantaged citizens (wealthier, better-educated and urban residents) show the strongest approval of SCSs, along with older people". Kostka explained in the paper that "while one might expect such knowledgeable citizens to be most concerned about the privacy implications of SCS, they instead appear to embrace SCSs because they interpret it through frames of benefit-generation and promoting honest dealings in society and the economy instead of privacy-violation."

In August 2019, assistant researcher Zhengjie Fan of China Institute of International Studies published an article, claiming that the current punishment policies such as the blacklist do not overstep the limits of law. He argued that since 2014, China's social credit system and the credit system of the market had grown to complement each other, forming a mutually beneficial interaction. According to Doing Business 2019 by World Bank Group which ranked "190 countries on the ease of doing business within their borders", China rose from 78th place in previous year to 46th place and Fan claimed that the social credit system has played an important role. In 2020, it further improved to 31st place in the now-defunct Ease of Doing Business index.

In an October 2022 study, professors from Princeton University, Freie Universität Berlin (Genia Kostka), and Pennsylvania State University discovered through a field survey of college students in China that "revealing the repressive potential of the SCS significantly reduces support for the system, whereas emphasizing its function in maintaining social order does not increase support." Additionally, the professors found that a nationwide survey of Chinese netizens showed higher support for the SCS among Chinese citizens who learned about it through state media.

=== Criticism ===
Social credit system practices have been criticized by legal scholars for lacking legal bases and violating several legal principles. In October 2019, Professor Kui Shen of the Law School of Peking University published a paper in China Legal Science, suggesting that some of the then-current credit policies violated the "rule of law" or "Rechtsstaat": that they infringed the legal rights of residents and organizations, possibly violated the principle of respecting and protecting human rights, especially the right to reputation, the right to privacy as well as personal dignity and overstepped the boundary of reasonable punishment. In May 2020, Chinese investigative media group Caixin reported that business social credit systems in China were insufficient in deterring problematic business activities and that the social credit system was easy to game in favour of businesses.

From 2017 to 2018, researchers argued that the credit system would be part of the government's plan to automate their authoritarian rule over the Chinese population. In June 2019, Samantha Hoffman of the Australian Strategic Policy Institute argued that "there are no genuine protections for the people and entities subject to the system... In China there is no such thing as the rule of law. Regulations that can be largely apolitical on the surface can be political when the Chinese Communist Party (CCP) decides to use them for political purposes." In August 2018, Professor Genia Kostka of Free University of Berlin stated in her published paper that "if successful in [their] effort, the Communist Party will possess a powerful means of quelling dissent, one that is comparatively low-cost and which does not require the overt (and unpopular) use of coercion by the state." In December 2017, Human Rights Watch described the proposed social credit system as "chilling" and filled with arbitrary abuses. In October 2018, U.S. Vice President Mike Pence criticized the social credit system, describing it as "an Orwellian system premised on controlling virtually every facet of human life." In January 2019, George Soros criticized the social credit system, saying it would give CCP leader Xi Jinping "total control over the people of China".

== Misconceptions ==
There has been a degree of misreporting and misconceptions in English-language mass media due to translation errors, sensationalism, conflicting information and lack of comprehensive analysis. Examples of such popular misconceptions include a widespread misassumption that Chinese citizens are rewarded and punished based on a numerical score (social credit score) assigned by the system, that its decisions are taken by AI and that it constantly monitors Chinese citizens. European misconceptions of social credit in China have become a source of amusement among Chinese Internet users. The phenomenon of persistent misreporting in spite of strong research demonstrating otherwise has been described by Marianne von Blomberg and Chuncheng Liu as "Techno-orientalism".

In 2014, after the Chinese government released the China's Planning Outline for Social Credit plan, media in Netherlands first reported on the system as a citizen rating system, likely stemming from the misconception of "Unified Social Credit Identifier" (统一社会信用代码) as a score, although it referred to citizens' ID numbers or an equivalent for corporations. Later, Rick Falkvinge, founder of the Swedish Pirate Party, wrote an article on the Privacy Online News blog in 2015, connecting the social credit system to global privacy concerns; the article was later deleted and replaced with a corrective. The contents of the article was picked up by major media outlets, despite the corrective, perpetuating the myth of a high-tech scoring system. Academic Michel Hockx describes Western media narratives as initially "very tendentious ... Scholars with actual fact-based knowledge responded incisively to these biased reports and eventually most media outlets either published corrections or simply updated their online articles".

In May 2018, Rogier Creemers of Leiden University stated that despite the Chinese government's intentions of utilizing big data and artificial intelligence, the regulatory method of SCS remained relatively crude. His research concluded that it is "... perhaps more accurate to conceive of the SCS as an ecosystem of initiatives broadly sharing a similar underlying logic, than a fully unified and integrated machine for social control." In November 2018, Foreign Policy listed some factors which contributed to the misconception of China's credit system. The potential factors included the scale and variety of the social credit system program and the difficulties of comprehensive reporting that comes with it.

In November 2018, Bing Song, director of the Berggruen Institute China Center, posted an opinion piece in The Washington Post, arguing that the Western media and institutions have misreported the details and mechanics of the social credit system. The article suggested that media have confused private score reporting mechanisms with the national system.

In March and February 2019, MIT Technology Review stated that, "[i]n the West, the system is highly controversial and often portrayed as an AI-powered surveillance regime that violates human rights." However, the magazine reported that "many scholars argue that social credit scores won't have the wide-scale controlling effect presumed...the system acts more as a tool of propaganda than a tool of enforcement" and that "[o]thers point out that it is simply an extension of Chinese culture's long tradition of promoting good moral behavior and that Chinese citizens have a completely different perspective on privacy and freedom."

In May 2019, Logic published an article by Shazeda Ahmed, who argued that "[f]oreign media has distorted the social credit system into a technological dystopia far removed from what is actually happening in China." She pointed out that common misconceptions included the beliefs that surveillance data is connected with a centralized database; that human activities online and offline are assigned with actual values that can be deducted and that every citizen in China has a numerical score that is calculated by computer algorithm. In July 2019, Wired reported that there existed misconceptions regarding the social credit system. It argued that "Western concerns about what could happen with China's Social Credit System have in some ways outstripped discussions about what's already really occurring...The exaggerated portrayals may also help to downplay surveillance efforts in other parts of the world." The rise of misconception, according to Jeremy Daum of Yale University, is contributed by translation errors, the difference in word usage and so on. Daum adds that "China prohibits internet anonymity, has ubiquitous surveillance cameras, and broad censorship and stability controls-- this has little to do with Social Credit".

In March 2021, The Diplomat remarked that the assumption by Western observers that the Social Credit System is an Orwellian surveillance system exaggerates the reality and purpose of the system in real life. Despite the claim, the social credit system is "an extension of bond issuance risk assessment credit ratings introduced in China in the 1980s" and primarily serves the function of a financial risk assessment tool. In October 2021, the Washington-based think tank The Jamestown Foundation explored the function of the social credit system and concluded that there were widespread misinterpretations regarding the function and mechanism of the SCS. The think tank found that misinformed perceptions of an algorithm-driven citizen-rating system are originated from early analyses that confused the regulation-enforcement mechanisms and the morality propaganda campaigns of the SCS initiative. Furthermore, many failed to distinguish between the government regulations and the private credit rating systems. Corporations hyperbolically promoted the scores' predictive abilities, which may have resonated with Western anxiety and concerns surrounding corporate data collection and government access to personal information.

In 2022, academics Diana Fu and Rui Hou noted the persistence of Western misconceptions in their article Rating Citizens with China's Social Credit System, stating, "Western media articles initially compared the system to an episode of the British sci-fi series Black Mirror in which individuals' every day behavior, down to the minutiae, were tracked and rated by other people and a "big brother" government. Since then, scholars and journalists have sought to dispel this dystopian depiction of the social credit system, but the image continued to live on, particularly after the Trump administration started to use it as part of its anti-China policy in 2017 and 2018."

In 2023, academic Filip Šebok wrote that perhaps the most common myth associated with social credit is that there is a single numerical score that records individuals' behavior. No such score exists. Academic Vincent Brussee writes that as of 2023, "hundreds of headlines have discussed the system, but few have systematically broken down what the [social credit system] is and how it works. Some studies refer to the 'breathtaking' ambition of the system and the 'massive quantities of behavioural data' going into the system without substantiating these claims in any way. Others rely on assumptions of what the system will look like, erroneously speculating that everyone will receive a social credit score, that this score will be publicly available, and that a bad rating will have far-reaching consequences. It is like a game of Chinese Whispers gone wrong."

=== Misconceptions of Zhima Credit and 2015 pilot programs ===
Alibaba's Zhima Credit, also rendered in English as Sesame Credit, is a private market credit initiative which ultimately became a loyalty program. It has frequently been mistaken for social credit.

In 2015, the PBOC designated eight private companies to pilot personal credit reporting (zhengxin) mechanisms. Because the pilot programs were zhengxin mechanisms, they had little connection to the idea of social credit more broadly. Zhima Credit was one of the pilot zhengxin mechanisms. It was an opt-in scoring initiative proposed to assess users' credit worthiness even if those users lacked formal credit history. It did not include standard industry metrics like income or debts, instead it assessed factors like user spending ability and whether users showed up for travel bookings.

Following the release of Zhima Credit, there was significant media speculation that it might turn into a national social credit system by 2020. This did not occur. Zhima Credit and the other pilot initiatives were never linked to the broader financial system. Zhima Credit did not prove to be an effective credit evaluation mechanism because the data showed no statistically significant link between its metrics and a user's ability to repay loans.

In one interview, Alibaba's technology director suggested that people who played too many video games might be considered less trustworthy. Various news outlets around the world incorrectly suggested that people could lose social credit for playing too many video games. No video game playing metric was ever implemented.

Ultimately Zhima Credit became a loyalty program that rewarded users for using Alibaba services and shopping platforms. PBOC decided not to extend the credit licenses of the eight private pilot programs from 2015.

== Popular culture ==
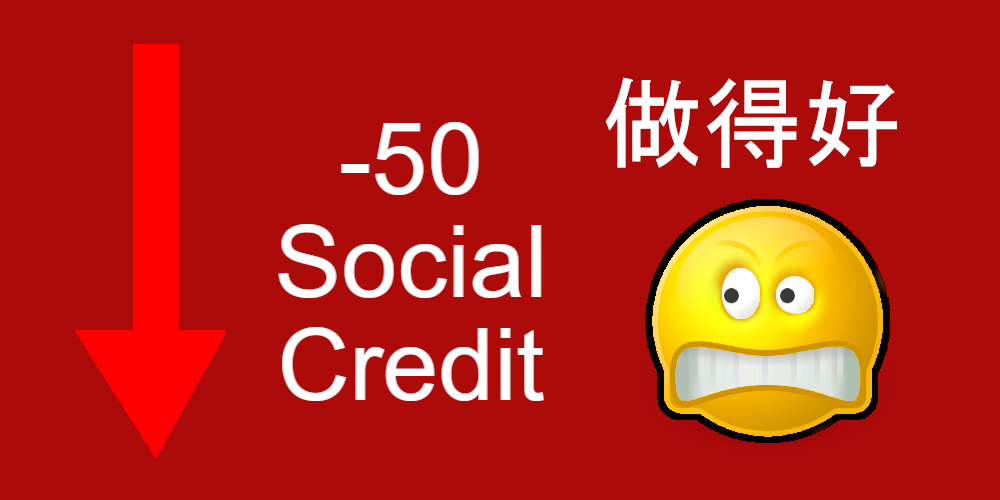
An example of a "social credit score" meme, with the Chinese emojis sarcastically translating to "well done".

In 2021, the social credit system was popularized as an Internet meme on various social media platforms. VICE reported that the memes' popularity reflects the "widespread discontent toward the Chinese government over its restrictions of people's freedoms", however, the article noted the trend continued the existing misapprehension and misinformation regarding the SCS mechanism, such as the idea that people in China are rewarded or punished based on a numerical "social credit score". The joke is often posed as a positive or negative action towards the Chinese government which affects the poster's "social credit score" positively or negatively.

According to a 2022 article in The Spectator, the Western narrative of the "social credit score" at the time received widespread mockery and satirical comments from the Chinese Internet community, due to the Western perception being drastically different from the reality in China.

== Comparison to other countries ==
=== Russia ===
Around 80% of Russians will reportedly get a digital profile that will document personal successes and failures in less than a decade under the government's comprehensive plans to digitize the economy. Observers have compared this to China's social credit system, although Deputy Prime Minister Maxim Akimov has denied that, saying a Chinese-style social credit system is a "threat".

=== Spain ===
In Spain, people who cannot repay their home mortgages may declare bankruptcy. Bankruptcy and foreclosure discharges the obligation to pay mortgage interest, but not mortgage principal. If mortgage principal is not paid, the debtor is placed on a list of untrustworthy people.

=== United Kingdom ===
In 2018, the New Economics Foundation compared the Chinese citizen score to other rating systems in the United Kingdom. These included using data from a citizen's credit score, phone usage, rent payment, and so on, to filter job applications, determine access to social services, determine advertisements served, etc.

=== United States ===
Some media outlets have compared the social credit system to credit scoring systems in the United States. According to Mike Elgan of Fast Company, "an increasing number of societal "privileges" related to transportation, accommodations, communications and the rates US citizens pay for services (like insurance) are either controlled by technology companies or affected by how we use technology services. And Silicon Valley's rules for being allowed to use their services are getting stricter."

=== Venezuela ===
In 2017, Venezuela started developing a smart-card ID known as the "carnet de la patria" or "fatherland card", with the help of the Chinese telecom company ZTE. The system included a database which stores details like birthdays, family information, employment and income, property owned, medical history, state benefits received, presence on social media, membership in a political party and whether a person voted. Many in Venezuela have expressed concern that the card is an attempt to tighten social control through monitoring all aspects of daily life.

== See also ==
- List of comparative social surveys
