= Judgment defaulter =

Concept in Chinese law

In China, judgment defaulter (Chinese: 失信被执行人) or court defaulters, commonly known as laolai (Chinese: 老赖) or untrustworthy person (Chinese: 失信人), is defined as a person who is able to fulfill legal obligations determined by the court, but has refused to do so, or illegally tries to evade enforcement such as hiding their assets.

According to the relevant regulations, persons who receive default judgment by the People's Courts are subject to restrictions on "high spending" or "high consumption" that are unrelated to basic living or business activities. These can include bans from traveling on high speed trains, or not being able to have your children go to private schools. Jeremy Daum, a senior research fellow at Yale Law School's Paul Tsai China Center, explains that the idea is that since the majority of "court awards" are going to be monetary, the "judgement defaulters" should not be continuing to be spending a lot of money if they have not yet paid back the court award, and instead their money should be spent to "fix that problem".

== Background ==
According to statistics from the Supreme People's Court, the number of the cases concluded by People's Courts at all levels from 2008 to 2012 in which the defendant had property, more than 70 percent of the defendants had evaded, avoided or even violently resisted enforcement, and less than 30 percent of them had automatically fulfilled their obligations. It is also reported that the chronic problems caused by the laolai have seriously affected the harmony and stability of society. To this end, at the end of August 2013, the Supreme People's Court issued Several Provisions on the Publication of Information on the List of Judgement Defaulters.

== Inclusion procedure ==
=== Subject of disciplinary action ===
According to the Decision of the Supreme People's Court on Amending the Several Provisions of the Supreme People's Court on the Publication of Information on the List of Judgment Defaulters in Default of Trust adopted at the 1582nd meeting of the Judgment Committee of the Supreme People's Court on July 1, 2013, and amended according to the 1707th meeting of the Judgment Committee of the Supreme People's Court on January 16, 2017, the Supreme People's Court on the Publication of Information on the List of judgment defaulters in Default provides that the people's courts at all levels shall list judgment defaulters and impose credit discipline on them in accordance with the law:

1. Those who have the ability to perform but refuse to fulfill their obligations as determined by the legal instruments in force.
2. Obstructing or resisting judgment order by falsifying evidence, violence, threats, etc.
3. Evading judgment order by means of false litigation, false arbitration, concealing or transferring property.
4. Violation of the property reporting system.
5. Violation of consumption restriction order.
6. Refusing to fulfill the judgment order settlement agreement without justifiable reasons.

According to the Regulations, the period of inclusion in the list of persons who have failed to trust is two years. When the judgment defaulter has engaged in violence, threats to obstruct, resisted the implementation, or if the circumstances are particularly serious or the judgment defaulter has a number of breaches of trust, the period can be extended by 1 to 3 years. In addition, the people's courts at all levels shall not include the judgment defaulter in the list under one of the following circumstances, in accordance with the provisions of Article 1, paragraph 1:

1. Where sufficient and effective security has been provided.
2. Where the property is subject to seizure, attachment, freezing, etc. is sufficient to satisfy the debts determined by the legal documents in force.
3. Where the order of performance of the judgment defaulter is later, for which enforcement shall not be enacted according to law.
4. Other circumstances that do not belong to the ability to perform but refuse to fulfill the obligations determined by the effective legal documents.

In addition, if the judgment defaulter is a minor, the people's courts at all levels shall not include him/her in the list of judgment defaulters.

=== Information publicity ===
According to the Several Provisions of the Supreme People's Court on the Publication of Information on the List of Judgement Defaulters, the recorded and published information on the list of judgment defaulters shall include the following:

1. The name, unified social credit code (or organization code), and the name of the legal representative or person in charge of the legal person or other organization that is the defaulter.
2. The name, gender, age, and ID number of the natural person who is the judgment defaulter.
3. The obligations as determined by the effective legal documents and the performance of the judgment defaulter.
4. The specific circumstances of the judgment defaulter's breach of trust.
5. The production unit and document number of the basis of enforcement, the enforcement case number, the time of filing, and the enforcement court.
6. Other matters that the People's Court believes should be recorded and published that do not involve state secrets, commercial secrets, or personal privacy.

On October 24, 2013, the information publication and query platform of the list of judgment defaulters of the national courts (now China Defaulter Information Public Notification) was opened to the public. The public can input the name or name of the judgment defaulter to inquire about the information of the judgment defaulter, and the above information is announced to the public. In addition, local courts can also publish information on the list of judgment defaulters through bulletin boards, newspapers, radio, television, the Internet, and press conferences. In recent years there have also been court publicity of judgment defaulters through cinema screenings of films, and the information on the list of judgment defaulters is published in the form of Douyin and other social media. In July 2014, the Executive Bureau of the Supreme People's Court and People's Daily Online jointly launched the Ranking of Judgment Defaulter.

== Disciplinary measures ==
According to the Several Provisions of the Supreme People's Court on the Publication of Information on the List of Judgment Defaulter in Default of Trust, the Judgment Defaulter in default of trust will be subject to credit discipline in government procurement, bidding and tendering, administrative approval, government support, financing and credit, market access, qualification recognition, etc. According to the Decision of the Supreme People's Court on Amending the Several Provisions of the Supreme People's Court on Restricting High Consumption of Judgment Defaulter adopted at the 1487th Session of the Judicial Committee of the Supreme People's Court on May 17, 2010, and Amended in accordance with the Decision of the Supreme People's Court on Amending Certain Provisions of the Supreme People's Court on Restricting the High Consumption of the Judgment Defaulter adopted at the 1657th Meeting of the Judicial Committee of the Supreme People's Court on July 6, 2015 Supreme People's Court on Restricting the High Consumption of the Judgment Defaulter and Related Consumption Several Provisions on Consumption" stipulates that persons (natural persons) included in the list of judgment defaulters shall not engage in the following acts of high consumption and consumption not essential to life and work:

1. Choosing airplanes, soft sleepers on trains, ships of second class or higher when taking transportation.
2. High spending at hotels, hotels, nightclubs, golf courses, etc. above star level.
3. Buying real estate or building new, expanded, or high-grade renovated houses.
4. Leasing high-grade office buildings, hotels, apartments and other places for office work.
5. Purchase of non-business essential vehicles.
6. Travel, vacation.
7. Children attending high-priced private schools.
8. Paying high premiums for insurance and financial products.
9. Riding all seats of G trains, first-class or above seats of other trains, and other consumption behaviors that are not necessary for life and work. (The regulation applies to all train trips of China National Railway Group in the Mainland and Hong Kong)

In addition to the above measures, the judgment defaulter included in the list see their housing, bank accounts, pension, mobile payment accounts (such as Alipay, WeChat Pay, etc.) frozen and seized, and the judgment defaulter is not allowed to serve as the legal representative, director, supervisor, and senior management of any company nationwide, nor be allowed to enroll his or her children in private schools, and their speculation in stocks, leaving the country, taking out loans or applying for credit cards in financial institutions will also be restricted. At the same time, vehicles under the defaulter's name are not allowed to drive into the Expressways of the People's Republic of China, and once a vehicle under the defaulter's name enters or leaves an expressway toll booth, the vehicle will be suspended and transferred to the court by the highway enforcement brigade. According to the Criminal Law of the People's Republic of China Amendment (IX), which was implemented on November 1, 2015, people's court judgments and rulings have the ability to perform but refuse to do so, will be punished with "refusal to take action called by the judgment. For serious circumstances, the penalty shall be imprisonment for up to three years, detention, or a fine; if the circumstances are particularly serious, the penalty shall be imprisonment for a term of more than three years and up to seven years and a fine.

Since July 2015, Zhima Credit, a subsidiary of Ant Group, and the Supreme People's Court have realized a system connection to update the data of judgment defaulters in real time. Once an Alipay user is included in the list of judgment defaulters, their Sesame Credit score will be deducted, and their consumption and shopping at Sesame Credit's merchant partners will also be restricted. In addition, there are also some places that cooperate with communication operators to set up exclusive colored ring for the judgment defaulter, and the opening cannot be canceled without the consent of the court. If the public calls the phone number under the name of the judgment defaulter, an alert will be reported that the owner is listed as a judgment defaulter. In Beijing, people who are included in the list of judgment defaulters are not allowed to participate in the minibus lottery.

According to a press conference held by the Supreme People's Court on July 10, 2018, as of July 2018, there were 7.89 million cases of judgment defaulters in mainland China under publication, involving 4.4 million judgment defaulters. In terms of punishment, 12.22 million people have been restricted from purchasing air tickets, 4.58 million people have been restricted from purchasing tickets for moving trains and high-speed trains, and 280,000 people have been restricted from serving as legal representatives and executives of enterprises. Nationwide, 2.8 million judgment defaulters are forced to fulfill their obligations automatically due to the pressure of credit discipline.

== Notable people ==
Prominent persons included in the list of judgment defaulter judgment defaulters

- Huang Hongming, former chairman of Guangdong Chuang Hong Group. 2014, he was listed on the list of judgment defaulters for violating the property reporting system
- Jia Yueting (Chinese: 贾跃亭), founder and former chairman of LeEco. listed as a judgment defaulter by the Beijing Third Intermediate People's Court on December 11, 2017
- Xu Zongheng (Chinese: 许宗衡), former mayor of Shenzhen Municipal People's Government, was sentenced to a suspended death sentence for taking bribes in 2011. He was later included in the list of judgment defaulters by the Zhengzhou Central Court on July 17, 2018, for failing to fulfill his obligation to "forfeit all his personal property" as determined by the effective legal instrument
- Sun Huahua, former chairman of the board of directors of Dahua New Material, a New Third Board company, applied for resignation as chairman of the board of directors in March 2018 due to personal inclusion as a judgment defaulter
- Dai Wei, founder and CEO of OFO. Listed by the Beijing Haidian District People's Court on December 4, 2018, as a judgment defaulter
- Michelle Ye, actress, was included in the list of judgment defaulters by Shanghai Xuhui District People's Court in December 2018 and fined RMB 80,000 yuan on March 5, 2019, for refusing to fulfill her obligations
- Pang Qingnian (Chinese: 庞青年), chairman of the Board of Directors of China Youth Automobile Group. As of May 2019, has been listed as a judgment defaulter by the court 8 times
- Shi Hongliu, the chairman of Hosa International, is listed by the court as a judgment defaulter
- Jiang Peizhen, the founder and chairman of Golden Voice Holding Group Co. Ltd Listed as a judgment defaulter by Shanghai No. 1 Intermediate People's Court and Ningbo Yinzhou District People's Court for defaulting on 51,949,800 yuan in advertising fees and failing to fulfill financial loan contracts
- Luo Yonghao, CEO of Smartisan, was listed as a judgment defaulter by the court for failing to fulfill the payment obligations determined by the effective legal documents
- 马平, CEO of Jiangsu Heryo Group、宾利车主，listed as a judgment defaulter by Zhangjiagang City People's Court on July 16, 2019, for violating the property reporting system

== See also ==
- Default judgment
- Blacklisting
- Blacklist (employment)
- Chinese social relations
- Reputation capital
- Reputation management
- Reputation system
- Social issues in China
- Social Credit System
