= List of comparative social surveys =

Below is a list of comparative social surveys. Survey methodology aims to measure general patterns among a population through statistical methods. Comparative research "seeks to compare and contrast nations, cultures, societies, and institutions.", usually defined as comparing at least two different societies or nations.

Name	Topic	Number of countries	Years	Source
USIA XX Surveys	Foreign and security policy.	4	1955–1969	
International stratification, mobility and politics file	Intergenerational occupational mobility and political behaviour.	16	1956–1991	
The European Voter	Political behaviour, economic status.	6	1956–1998	
Pattern of Human Concerns Data	National and individual perceptions.	14	1957–1963	
Civic Culture Survey	Political beliefs.	5	1959–1960	
ECFIN Business and Consumer Surveys	Economic and business topics.	31	1962-	
Attitudes towards Europe	European integration.	5	1962	
Political Participation - An International Social Science Council (ISSC) Workbook in Comparative Analysis	Political attitudes and behaviour.	8	1963–1972	
Multinational Time Budget Study	Time management	12	1965–1966	
Political Participation and Equality in Seven Nations	Political participation.	7	1966–1971	
Images of the World in the Year 2000	Expectations of the future.	11	1967–1970	
Reader's Digest EURODATA - The Reader's Digest Survey of Europe Today	Lifestyles and attitudes.	18	1969, 1990	
Cross-National Equivalent File	Social statistics.	8	1970–	
Eurobarometer	Various topics.	27	1970–	
Scandinavian Welfare Study	Life situation.	4	1972	
USIA World Survey	Attitudes on domestic and global issues.	7	1972	
Political Action I/II	Political topics.	8	1973, 1981	
Luxembourg Income Study	Income and economic situation.	48	1979–	
European Election Studies	Election topics.	28	1979–	
Comparative Project on Class Structure and Class Consciousness	Social inequality and class relations.	10	1980–1987	
European Values Study, World Values Survey	Various topics.	90+	1981–	
International Social Survey Programme	Various topics.	42	1985–	
The Political Culture of Southern Europe: A Four Nation Study	Political culture.	4	1985	
International Crime Victims Survey	Crime.	48	1989–2005	
Free Elections, Political Parties and the Emergence of Competitive Party Systems in Eastern Europe	Election studies.	17	1989–2005	
European Working Conditions Survey	Labour issues.	28	1990–	
Post Communist Publics (PCP) I) Post communist Citizens 1990-1992 II) Consolidation of Democracy in Central and Eastern Europe 1998-2001: A Fifteen Country Study (CDCEE)	Political and economic issues.	11	1990–2001	
New Soviet Citizen Surveys	Political and economic issues.	3	1990–1992	
Comparative National Elections Project	Election studies.	28	1990–	
International Social Justice Project	Social justice.	13	1991, 1996	
New Europe Barometer	Various political and social issues.	19	1991–	
The Pulse of Europe	Various political and social issues.	13	1991	
Population Policy Acceptance Study	Various political and social issues.	14	1991, 2000	
Latin American Public Opinion Project	Political attitudes.	34	1991–2003	
Fertility and Family Survey	Family and social issues.	24	1991	
Social Change in Baltic Countries	Social issues.	3	1993	
Values and Political Change in Post-Communist Europe	Political issues.	5	1993–1994	
Social Stratification in Eastern Europe since 1989	Social issues.	6	1993–1994	
The Transformation Process in Hungary, Poland, in the Czech and Slovak Republic	Political and economic issues.	4	1993, 1995	
The European Community Household Panel	Social issues.	15	1994–2001	
NORBALT I and II Living Conditions in the Baltic Countries	Social issues.	3	1994, 1999	
International Adult Literacy Survey	Literacy and respondent background.	22	1994–2008	
East Asia Barometer	Political attitudes.	6	1994	
Luxembourg Wealth Study	Household wealth.	18	1994–	
Latinobarómetro	Political and social issues.	19	1995–	
Social Consequences of Transition	Issues related to social and political transition.	5	1995	
Comparative Study of Electoral Systems	Election studies.	55	1996–	
Coping with Government in the Former Soviet Union/Economic Commission for Europe	Political issues.	4	1996–1998	
East Asian Social Survey 1997	Social issues.	3	1996–1997	
New Departures: Religion and Attitudes toward Church in Eastern (Central) Europe	Religion and social issues.	10	1997, 2007	
Transition Barometer	Social and political issues.	4	1997, 2000	
People on war	War.	18	1999, 2009, 2016	
Harmonized European Time Use Survey	Time management.	15	1999–	
Afrobarometer	Various topics.	36	1999–	
EU Accession Opinion Survey	Attitudes towards the European Union.	11	2000	
Asia Europe Survey	Social issues.	18	2000	
Asian Barometer Survey	Various topics.	19	2001–	
Global Barometer Surveys	Various topics.	55	2001–	
EU Index	Attitudes towards the EU.	14	2001–2006	
Political Culture in Central and Eastern Europe / Political Culture and Democratic Values in New Democracies	Political and social issues.	14	2001–2002	
E-LIVING: Life in Digital Europe	Information technology and social issues.	6	2001–2002	
Generations & Gender Programme	Social change.	20	2002–	
European Social Survey	Social issues.	38	2002–	
Transatlantic Trends Survey	Attitudes towards global issues.	16	2002–	
East Asia Value Survey	Social issues.	5	2002, 2004	
Pew Global Attitudes Survey	Various topics.	54	2002–	
The Voice of the People	Various topics.	67	2003–	
Asia Barometer	Various topics.	14+	2003–2008	
European Quality of Life Survey	Social issues.	34	2003–	
Global Corruption Barometer	Corruption.	107	2003–	
Americas Barometer	Various topics.	29	2004–	
Survey of Health, Ageing and Retirement in Europe	Social issues.	28	2004–	
EU Statistics on Income and Living Conditions	Social issues.	28	2004–	
European Internal Movers Social Survey	Migration.	5	2004–2005	
European Crime and Safety Survey	Crime and safety.	18	2005–	
Gallup World Poll	Various topics.	160	2005–	
Life in Transition Survey	Various topics.	35	2006, 2010, 2016	
Caucasus Barometer	Various topics.	3	2006–	
East Asian Social Survey	Social issues.	4	2006–	
The Surveillance Project	Surveillance.	9	2006–2007	
Arab Barometer	Various topics.	12	2007–	
Integrated and United? A Quest for Citizenship in an Ever Closer Europe	Perceptions of citizenship.	18	2007, 2009	
Transatlantic Trends: Immigration	Global issues and immigration.	8	2008–2011	
Program for the International Assessment of Adult Competencies	Economic skills and problem-solving.	40+	2008–	
Household Finance and Consumption Survey	Social issues.	20	2010–	
Making Electoral Democracy Work	Political issues.	5	2010, 2015	
Crossing Borders Making Europe	European integration.	6	2011–2014	
EU Neighbourhood Barometer	Perceptions of the EU.	16	2012–2014	
Gross Domestic Behavior	Civic behavior ranking of states of India	22	2025 onwards	
Social Credit System	Social Credit System of China			
Gross National Happiness				
