= Comparative research =

Research methodology that makes comparisons across different countries or cultures

Comparative research is a research methodology in the social sciences exemplified in cross-cultural or comparative studies that aims to make comparisons across different countries or cultures. A major problem in comparative research is that the data sets in different countries may define categories differently (for example by using different definitions of poverty) or may not use the same categories.

== Definition ==
Comparative research, simply put, is the act of comparing two or more things with a view to discovering something about one or all of the things being compared. This technique often utilizes multiple disciplines in one study. When it comes to method, the majority agreement is that there is no methodology peculiar to comparative research. The multidisciplinary approach is good for the flexibility it offers, yet comparative programs do have a case to answer against the call that their research lacks a "seamless whole."

There are certainly methods that are far more common than others in comparative studies, however. Quantitative analysis is much more frequently pursued than qualitative, and this is seen by the majority of comparative studies which use quantitative data. The general method of comparing things is the same for comparative research as it is in our everyday practice of comparison. Like cases are treated alike, and different cases are treated differently; the extent of difference determines how differently cases are to be treated. If one is able to sufficiently distinguish two carry the research conclusions will not be very helpful.

Secondary analysis of quantitative data is relatively widespread in comparative research, undoubtedly in part because of the cost of obtaining primary data for such large things as a country's policy environment. This study is generally aggregate data analysis. Comparing large quantities of data (especially government sourced) is prevalent. A typical method of comparing welfare states is to take balance of their levels of spending on social welfare.

In line with how a lot of theorizing has gone in the last century, comparative research does not tend to investigate "grand theories," such as Marxism. It instead occupies itself with middle-range theories that do not purport to describe our social system in its entirety, but a subset of it. A good example of this is the common research program that looks for differences between two or more social systems, then looks at these differences in relation to some other variable coexisting in those societies to see if it is related. The classic case of this is Esping-Andersen's research on social welfare systems. He noticed there was a difference in types of social welfare systems, and compared them based on their level of decommodification of social welfare goods. He found that he was able to class welfare states into three types, based on their level of decommodification. He further theorized from this that decommodification was based on a combination of class coalitions and mobilization, and regime legacy. Here, Esping-Andersen is using comparative research: he takes many western countries and compares their level of decommodification, then develops a theory of the divergence based on his findings.

Comparative research can take many forms. Two key factors are space and time. Spatially, cross-national comparisons are by far the most common, although comparisons within countries, contrasting different areas, cultures or governments also subsist and are very constructive, especially in a country like New Zealand, where policy often changes depending on which race it pertains to. Recurrent interregional studies include comparing similar or different countries or sets of countries, comparing one's own country to others or to the whole world.

The historical comparative research involves comparing different time-frames. The two main choices within this model are comparing two stages in time (either snapshots or time-series), or just comparing the same thing over time, to see if a policy's effects differ over a stretch of time.

When it comes to subject matter of comparative inquiries, many contend there is none unique to it. This may indeed be true, but a brief perusal of comparative endeavours reveals there are some topics more recurrent than others. Determining whether socioeconomic or political factors are more important in explaining government action is a familiar theme. In general, however, the only thing that is certain in comparative research issues is the existence of differences to be analysed.

== Development ==
As Stavros Moutsios argues, cross-cultural and comparative research should be seen as part of the scientific spirit that arose in Greece in the 6th century and the overall appreciation of knowledge and learning that was characteristic of the 5th century. In other words, it is part of the emergence of episteme and philo-sophia, as a love for knowledge that is independent from material benefits. Episteme, as a form and activity in the field of logos, marked the break of cognitive closure and advanced empirical inquiry, logical argumentation and the search for truth. And the high esteem for intellectual activity gave rise to a genuine curiosity about other cultures – which has lain thereafter at the heart of comparative inquiry.

Moreover, behind the Greek comparative gaze also was the philosophical and political questioning which characterised the life of the democratic polis. Philosophical inquiry, from the Milesians down to the Sophists, questioned the representations and the cognitive traditions of their own people; the inquiry of the traditions of other peoples was, as Herodotus’ Histories demonstrate, an activity associated with the ethos of philosophical critique that characterised democratic life in Greece. Similarly, questioning of the Greek laws and institutions and its related values and practices (e.g. isegoria and parrhesia), as part of Greek politics, is associated with the effort of the first historians to reflect on home institutions through researching those of others.

According also to Karl Deutsch, we have been using this form of investigation for over 2,000 years. Comparing things is essential to basic scientific and philosophic inquiry, which has been done for a long time. Most authors are more conservative in their estimate of how long comparative research has been with us. It is largely an empty debate over the definition of the tradition with those questioning whether comparing things counts as comparative research.

Textbooks on this form of study were beginning to appear by the 1880s, but its rise to extreme popularity began after World War II. There are numerous reasons that comparative research has come to take a place of honour in the toolbox of the social scientist. Globalization has been a major factor, increasing the desire and possibility for educational exchanges and intellectual curiosity about other cultures. Information technology has enabled greater production of quantitative data for comparison, and international communications technology has facilitated this information to be easily spread.

== See also ==
- Analytic frame
- Comparative cultural studies
- Comparative history
- Comparative method
- Comparative mythology
- Comparative sociology
- List of comparative surveys
- Social research
- Sociological imagination
