= Larry Diamond =

American political sociologist (born 1951)

Larry Jay Diamond
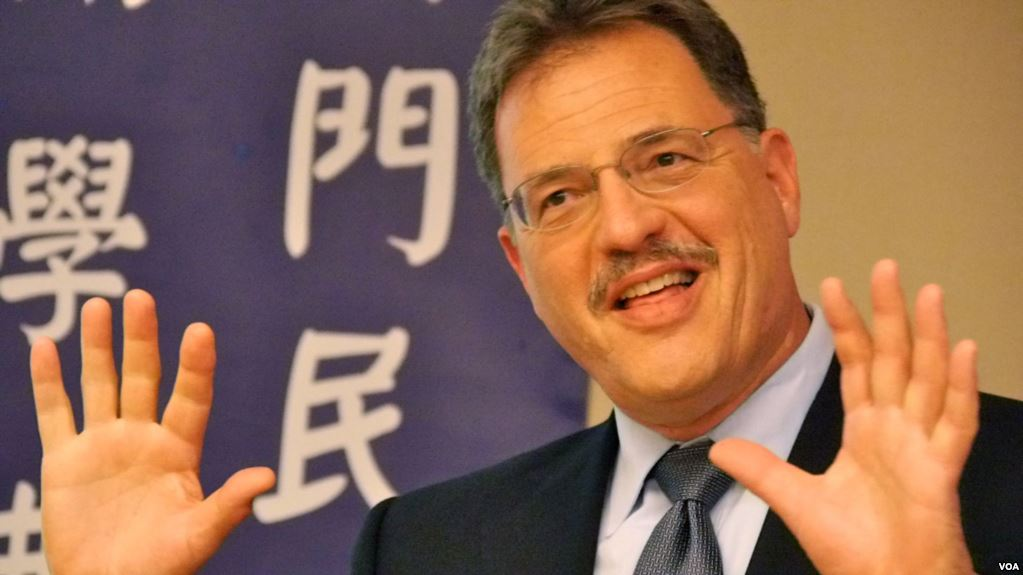
- Larry Diamond (2014)
- Born: October 2, 1951 (age 75); U.S.
- Education: Stanford University
- Occupations: Sociologist, scholar, researcher, educator
- Known for: Political sociology, democracy studies

Larry Jay Diamond (born October 2, 1951) is an American political sociologist and scholar in the field of democracy studies. He is the William L. Clayton Senior Fellow at the Hoover Institution, a public policy think tank on the Stanford campus working to advance freedom and prosperity, and the Mosbacher Senior Fellow in Global Democracy at the Freeman Spogli Institute for International Studies (FSI), Stanford University's main center for research on international issues. At FSI Diamond served as the director of the Center on Democracy, Development, and the Rule of Law (CDDRL) from 2009 to 2015. He was succeeded in that role by Francis Fukuyama and then Kathryn Stoner.

Diamond served as a founding co-editor of the National Endowment for Democracy's Journal of Democracy from 1990 until fall 2022. As of August 2025, he co-chairs Hoover’s Project on Taiwan in the Indo-Pacific Region Project (with James O. Ellis, Jr.). At FSI, he founded the program on Arab Reform and Development and the Israel Studies Program, and he co-founded and leads its Global Digital Policy Incubator.

== Early life and education ==
Diamond was born in Los Angeles. He is Jewish. He earned a B.A. in Political Organization and Behavior from Stanford in 1974, where he was active in student politics and journalism and co-chaired committees on admissions and teaching quality. From 1974 to 1975 he conducted interviews in multiple countries on democratic change and development. He received an M.A. from the Food Research Institute in 1978 and a Ph.D. in Sociology in 1980 at Stanford, working with Alex Inkeles and Seymour Martin Lipset.

== Career ==
Diamond taught sociology at Vanderbilt University from 1980 to 1985, researching Nigeria’s Second Republic and spending a year in Kano as a Fulbright Lecturer. His work on corruption and electoral fraud in Nigeria informed later publications, including In Search of Democracy (2016) and Transition Without End (1997).

He joined Stanford’s Hoover Institution in 1985. With Juan Linz and Seymour Martin Lipset he co-led a 26-country study on democratization, resulting in the Democracy in Developing Countries book series (1988–1995). This laid the groundwork for the Journal of Democracy, which Diamond co-founded with Marc F. Plattner. Together they also co-directed the International Forum for Democratic Studies at the National Endowment for Democracy (1994–2009).

Diamond has collaborated with Taiwan-based scholars, beginning with a 1995 international conference on democratization. He co-developed the Asian Barometer Survey and has written on Taiwan’s political development, favoring strong U.S. support for Taiwan’s democracy and security. He has also co-led Hoover’s “China’s Sharp Power” projects, producing studies on China’s influence operations and semiconductor security.

He was the dissertation adviser for Regina Ip, former Secretary for Security of Hong Kong during her years at Stanford.

In 2022, Diamond joined Yermak-McFaul Expert Group on Russian Sanctions as an expert to work on elaborating and imposing international sanctions against Russia which invaded Ukraine.

=== Post–2003 Iraq ===
In early 2004, Diamond was a senior adviser on governance to the Coalition Provisional Authority in Iraq.

His book Squandered Victory: The American Occupation and the Bungled Effort to Bring Democracy to Iraq, published in 2005, was one of the first public critical analyses of America's post-invasion of Iraq strategy.

== Views on democracy ==
Although a strong proponent of democracy, Diamond has emphasized that its survival depends on effective and accountable governance, respect for the rule of law, and responsiveness to citizens’ needs. In his 2023 Seymour Martin Lipset Lecture, later published in the Journal of Democracy (2024), he identified power, performance, and legitimacy as central to democracy’s endurance. He has argued that weak economic or political performance, such as corruption, crime, or insecurity, can erode public support, while effective governance can strengthen democratic commitment.

Diamond contends that excessive focus on procedure results in a flawed concept of democracy which "privileges elections over other dimensions of democracy and ignores the degree to which multiparty elections (even if they are competitive and uncertain in outcome) may exclude significant portions of the population from contesting for power or advancing or defending their interests, or may leave significant areas of decision making beyond the control of elected officials."

Diamond’s writings, including Developing Democracy (1999), The Spirit of Democracy (2008), and Ill Winds (2019), have highlighted both the promise of democracy and the challenges it faces. He has pointed to threats from authoritarian powers such as China and Russia, as well as democratic backsliding within established democracies. His work defines democracy broadly, requiring free and fair elections, political freedom, and pluralism. In a 2002 Journal of Democracy article, he warned about “hybrid regimes” or “electoral authoritarian” systems that mask autocratic practices behind democratic appearances. He has also criticized the failure to recognize such trends in countries including Russia, Venezuela, Hungary, and Turkey. His collaborative 2004 article with Leonardo Morlino, followed by a 2005 edited volume, offered a framework for assessing the “quality of democracy.”

From his early studies of Nigeria’s First Republic, Diamond has underscored corruption, waste, and abuse of power as key causes of democratic breakdowns. He has argued that while economic development supports democracy, it is not an absolute requirement. Cases such as India, Costa Rica, and Botswana show that democracy can emerge in lower-income settings when supported by good governance, steady growth, limited inequality, democratic values, and a strong civil society. He has warned that persistent misgovernance can push people toward authoritarian alternatives, particularly in “predatory states” where corruption is pervasive and wealth is extracted through exploitation rather than productive growth. In resource-rich countries, he has suggested distributing oil revenues directly to citizens to promote accountability.

In policy discussions, including contributions to USAID reports, Diamond has called for tying foreign assistance to the quality of governance. He has supported the principle of “selectivity,” as seen in the Millennium Challenge Corporation, which conditions aid on democratic governance, investment in social development, and economic openness. He has also urged the United States and other democracies to devote more resources to strengthening democratic institutions, media, and civil society abroad, along with promoting democratic values in foreign policy.

== Research ==
A central theme in Diamond's work is democratic consolidation, examined in Developing Democracy: Toward Consolidation (1999) and later essays. He has argued that stable democracy depends on accountability, the rule of law, effective governance, and public trust. He has also written on hybrid or “electoral authoritarian” regimes, where elections coexist with repression, and with Leonardo Morlino developed a framework for assessing the “quality of democracy.”

His regional studies cover Africa, Asia, Latin America, and the Middle East. He has analyzed Nigeria’s democratic breakdowns, co-edited volumes on Taiwan’s democratic transition, and examined East Asian political culture through the Asian Barometer Survey, which he co-founded. In 2024 he co-edited The Troubling State of India’s Democracy, addressing challenges to institutional independence in India.

Diamond has also studied the international dimensions of democratization. He has argued that foreign aid and policy should encourage accountable governance and has critiqued externally driven regime change, as in his book Squandered Victory (2005). He has called for greater support of democratic institutions, civil society, and media worldwide.

Since 2008, Diamond has written about the “global democratic recession,” linking democratic decline to authoritarian resurgence, polarization, and weakening institutions. His book Ill Winds (2019) explored these themes, and his 2025 co-edited volume with Edward Foley and Richard Pildes addressed electoral reforms such as ranked choice voting in the United States.

== Teaching and public service ==
Diamond was named Stanford's "Teacher of the Year" in May 2007. At the June 2007 commencement ceremonies he was awarded the Dinkelspiel Award for Distinctive Contributions to Undergraduate Education. Among the many reasons for Diamond to receive this award it was cited that he fostered dialogue between Jewish and Muslim students.

In addition to his academic work, Diamond has served on advisory boards and task forces for the U.S. Agency for International Development, the Council on Foreign Relations, the Freedom House "Freedom in the World" survey, and the Council for a Community of Democracies. He is also a member of the Pacific Council on International Policy and the American Political Science Association.

== Awards and fellowships ==
Diamond's work has been supported by fellowships and grants from the Smith Richardson Foundation, the MacArthur Foundation, the National Endowment for Democracy, and the Agency for International Development. He was a Fulbright Fellow in Nigeria in 1982–83 and a POSCO Visiting Fellow at the East-West Center in Honolulu.

=== Selected affiliations ===
- Member, Editorial Board, Journal of Democracy
- Member, Editorial Board, Current History
- Board member, Voices of a Democratic Egypt
- Member, Conference Group on Taiwan Studies
- Faculty Advisory Board, Haas Center for Public Service

== Publications ==
=== Books ===
==== As author ====
- Ill Winds: Saving Democracy from Russian Rage, Chinese Ambition, and American Complacency, Penguin Press, 2019 ISBN 978-0525560623
- In Search of Democracy, Routledge, 2016
- The Spirit of Democracy, Times Books, 2008
- Squandered Victory: The American Occupation and the Bungled Effort to Bring Democracy to Iraq, Owl Books, 2005, ISBN 0-8050-7868-1
- Developing Democracy: Toward Consolidation, Johns Hopkins University Press, 1999
- Promoting Democracy in the 1990s, Carnegie Commission on Preventing Deadly Conflict, 1995
- Class, Ethnicity, and Democracy in Nigeria, Syracuse University Press, 1988
- Milani, Abbas; Diamond, Larry Jay (2015). Politics and Culture in Contemporary Iran: Challenging the Status Quo. Boulder, CO: Lynne Rienner Publishers. ISBN 9781626371477.

==== As editor ====
- Political Culture and Democracy in Developing Countries
- Diamond, Larry; Plattner, Marc F.; Walker, Christopher, eds. (2016). Authoritarianism Goes Global: The Challenge to Democracy. Johns Hopkins University Press. ISBN 9781421419985.
- Democracy in Decline?, with Marc F. Plattner
- Democratization and Authoritarianism in the Arab World, with Marc F. Plattner
- Will China Democratize?, with Andrew J. Nathan and Marc F. Plattner (2013, containing articles of the Journal of Democracy, written between 1986 and 2013)
- Democracy in East Asia: A New Century, with Yun-han Chu and Marc F. Plattner
- Liberation Technology: Social Media and the Struggle for Democracy, with Marc F. Plattner
- Politics and Culture in Contemporary Iran, with Abbas Milani
- Democracy in Developing Countries, four-volume series, with Juan J. Linz and Seymour Martin Lipset

=== Essays and articles ===
- Milani, Abbas; Diamond, Larry (July 6, 2009). "Let's Hear the Democracies". The New York Times (Op-ed). ISSN 1553-8095.
