= Jiayuan.com =

Internet dating website in China

Jiayuan.com International
- Company type: Public
- Traded as: Nasdaq: DATE
- Industry: Internet
- Founded: 2003; 23 years ago, in Beijing
- Website: www.jiayuan.com

Jiayuan.com (Chinese: 世纪佳缘; pinyin: shìjì jiāyuán) is the largest internet dating website in the People's Republic of China. Jiayuan was founded by current CEO Rose Gong from her dormitory room at Fudan University in Shanghai in 2003. Jiayuan now has 40.2 million users, and 4.7 million monthly active users. It is the largest internet dating website in China in terms of revenue, total members, and active monthly members.

As opposed to many American Online dating websites, Chinese online dating websites tend to focus on finding a husband or wife. Jiayuan is designed to help Chinese singles find marriage, and discourages its members from pursuing short term flings.

Jiayuan is the 60th most visited website in China, and the 336th most popular website in the world according to Alexa.com.

In October 2010 Jiayuan started its wedding planning service, Xique.com.

Jiayuan was publicly traded on the Nasdaq under the stock symbol "DATE".

In an announcement made on December 9, 2015, Baihe Network, agreed to acquire Jiayuan.com for US$7.56 per American Depository Share.
