= Emmanuel Gyimah-Boadi =

Ghanaian political scientist (born 1953)

- Born: 2 October 1953 (age 73); Ghana
- Citizenship: Ghanaian
- Education: University of Ghana; University of California, Davis
- Known for: Co-founder of the Afrobarometer and the Ghana Center for Democratic Development
- Awards: National Academy of Sciences
- Scientific career
- Fields: Sociology; Political Sciences
- Workplaces: Ghana Center for Democratic Development

Emmanuel Gyimah-Boadi is a Ghanaian political scientist and the co-founder of the Afrobarometer, a pan-African research project that surveys public attitude on political, social and economic reforms across African countries. He was the CEO of Afrobarometer from 2008 to 2021. He is the chair of its board of directors.

== Education ==
Gyimah-Boadi holds a Bachelor of Arts in political science from the University of Ghana and a Master of Arts and Ph.D in political science from the University of California, Davis.

== Career ==
Gyimah-Boadi's research focusses on democratic politics in Africa, specifically political reforms and liberalism in Ghana. He was a professor at the University of Ghana, in the department of political science, from 1986 to 2014. He was the executive director of the Ghana Center for Democratic Development, a research and advocacy institute he co-founded.

== Honours and awards ==
In 2017, Gyimah-Boadi received the Martin Luther King, Jr. Award for Peace and Social Justice, given by the US embassy to Ghana for advancing democracy, good governance, and economic opportunity.

In 2018, he was named the 2018 Distinguished Africanist Award of the African Studies Association of USA "for his outstanding scholarship and service to the Africanist community".

In 2019, he became an international member of the US National Academy of Sciences.

In 2021, Gyimah-Boadi was named one of the 100 Most Influential Africans by New African Magazine.

== Publications ==
- "Associational Life, Civil Society, and Democratization in Ghana", chapter in Civil Society and the State in Africa, eds. John W. Harbeson, Donald Rothchild and Naomi Chazan (1994), Lynne Rienner Publishers, ISBN 9781685859350
- Gyimah-Boadi, E., (1996). "Civil Society in Africa". Journal of Democracy, Vol. 7, No. 2, pp. 118–132
- editor, Democratic Reform in Africa: The Quality of Progress (2004), Lynne Rienner Publishers, ISBN 9781588262219
- Bratton, M., Mattes, R. and Gyimah-Boadi, E., (2005) Public Opinion, Democracy and Market Reform in Africa, Cambridge University Press, ISBN 9780511617324
- Gyimah-Boadi, E., and Asunka, J. (2021) "The Future Africans Want: When Optimism Is Power". European Union Institute for Security Studies (EUISS)
