= Dang'an =

Dang'an (simplified Chinese: 档案; traditional Chinese: 檔案; pinyin: dàng'àn) is a Chinese word meaning "archived record/file". Used in the political and administrative context, it means a permanent dossier or archival system that records the "performance and attitudes" of citizens of the People's Republic of China. Together with the current system of household registration, the Hukou system, it has been an important part of the government's efforts to maintain control of its people. Majority of the records are kept by the local archive bureaus, some by the State Archives Administration of China at the national level.

== Contents ==
The Dang'an includes personal information such as physical characteristics, employment record, photograph, etc. However, it also contains many other documents that would be considered private in some other cultures. According to Wang Fei-ling and other sources, this includes appraisals by supervisors and peers, academic reports from primary school to university, professional credentials, any criminal convictions or administrative penalties, club/society memberships, employment records, and political history (such as Youth League and CPC membership and assessments). Some of the material is composed by the subject. Even the death certificate and eulogy may be placed in the file.

There are two copies for adults: one held on behalf of their work unit by its supervisory organization, and the other at the local Public Security Bureau (PSB). Access to dang'an is strictly controlled. Citizens do not usually see their dang'an, although they may ask a Communist Party member to check it for them. Alterations may only be carried out by special cadres, and when combined with the custom of guanxi the result is that, "Personal revenge, false entries, and special favors are thus part of the game."

A Montreal-based human rights group has claimed that the PSB is in the process of computerizing the hundreds of millions of dang'an.

== Significance ==
During the Maoist era, these dossiers were consulted by work unit officials as they made decisions about the major life events of those under their control. Urban residents were assigned jobs by the state. Thereafter, permission from the work unit was needed for marriage, childbirth, and transferring the dang'an (i.e., changing workplace). During the Cultural Revolution era, they were even used to determine which individuals and families would be sent to carry out manual labour in the countryside, under the theory of bloodlines. As late as 2003, academic Zhou Jinghao could write that, "A work unit controls employees basically through the dang'an (personnel dossier) system. An employee cannot transfer to another work unit without his dang'an."

As Chinese economic reform has proceeded, the situation has been less clear-cut, as the dang'an system conflicts with market-oriented labour contracts. Graduates have been able to choose their own employment since the mid-1990s in most regions (the latest, Tibet, in 2006), and marriage has not required work unit consent since 2003. Some private companies in prosperous Guangdong do not even require access to the files, which remains with the employee's neighbourhood committee. However, individuals may still be granted or denied passports, promotions, and other benefits based on information in their dang'an. According to BBC journalist Rupert Wingfield-Hayes, "A black mark against you – a bad school report, a disagreement with your boss, a visit to a psychiatrist – all can travel with you for the rest of your life..." They are also used in investigations by the Ministry of State Security.

The dossier means that every individual is responsible for all of their behaviour and everything they do will be recorded for the rest of their life. Consequently the dossier discourages any 'errant' behaviour and is seen as aiding the harmonious nature of the person’s work unit.

— Ouyang Huhua,

== Limitations of the dang'an system ==
An embryonic dang'an is created when individuals enter the school system. This is similar to the permanent file of a school student in some Western school systems, and is transferred from school to school, but in China it is required for entry to university or a work unit, to which the file is then transferred. Millions of peasants, who work on family farms or in small businesses, never acquire a dang'an. Those who do are classified as either cadres (Chinese: ganbu) or workers (Chinese: gōngrén). It is difficult to cross this boundary.

According to Zhou, "private and foreign-funded enterprises are no longer required to receive the dang'an when they hire employees." Instead, foreign firms transfer them to the Ministry of Commerce.

The future of dang'an was questioned by Qiao Shi, P.R. China's number three leader in the mid-90s. In 1996, he proposed to the National People's Congress that the dang'an system be abolished. Both Qiao and the proposal fell out of favour the following year.

== Comparison to Western systems ==
American education activist John Taylor Gatto, for example, draws comparisons to dang'an in his critique of the United States school system.

== Computerized data repository ==
In 2015, the Financial Times reported that the 13th Five Year Plan, planned for the period 2016–2020, includes plans to establish a "centralised repository for citizen information" to "the creation of a robust [national] socio-psychological service system." This system has subsequently been referred to in English-language press accounts as the "social credit system".

== See also ==
- Public record
- Archive
- Social Credit System
