= Public records =

Non-confidential information generally pertaining to the conduct of government

Public records are documents or pieces of information that are not considered confidential and generally pertain to the conduct of government.

Depending on jurisdiction, examples of public records include information pertaining to births, deaths, marriages, and documented transactions with government agencies.

Attitudes and expectations about what information should be made public have been studied.

== History ==
Since the earliest organised societies, with taxation, disputes, and so on, records of some sort have been needed. In ancient Babylon records were kept in cuneiform writing on clay tablets. In the Inca empire of South America, which did not have writing, records were kept via an elaborate form of knots in cords, quipu, whose meaning has been lost.

In Western Europe in the Late Middle Ages public records included census records as well as records of birth, death, and marriage; an example is the 1086 Domesday Book of William the Conqueror. The details of royal marriage agreements, which were effectively international treaties, were also recorded. The United Kingdom Public Record Office Act, which formalised record-keeping by setting up the Public Record Office, was passed in 1838.

== Public records ==
- Records of law court proceedings
- Marriage records
- Mug shot
- Voter registration

== Access to public records ==
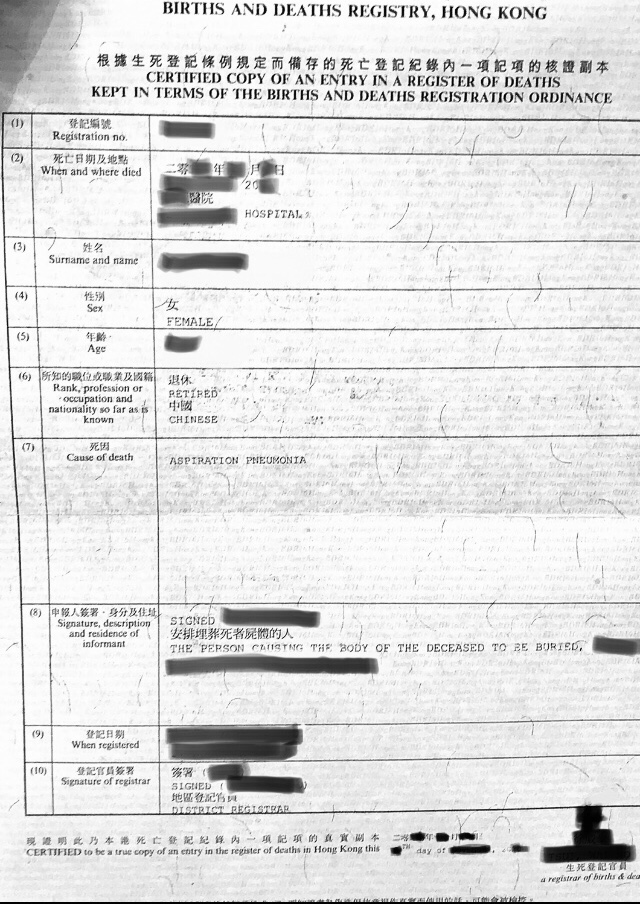
An example of public record, HK

Although public records are records of public business, they are not necessarily available without restriction, although Freedom of Information legislation (FOI) that has been gradually introduced in many jurisdictions since the 1960s has made access easier. Each government has policies and regulations that govern the availability of information contained in public records. A common restriction is that data about a person is not normally available to others; for example, the California Public Records Act (PRA) states that "except for certain explicit exceptions, personal information maintained about an individual may not be disclosed without the person's consent". For example, in California, when a couple fills out a marriage license application, they have the option of checking the box as to whether the marriage is "confidential" (Record will be closed, and not opened to public once recorded) or "public" (record will become public record once recorded). Essentially, if the marriage record is public, a copy of the record can be ordered from the county in which the marriage occurred.

In the United Kingdom, Cabinet papers were subject to the thirty-year rule: until the introduction of FOI legislation, Cabinet papers were not available for thirty years; some information could be withheld for longer. As of 2011 the rule still applies to some information, such as minutes of Cabinet meetings.

Some companies provide access, for a fee, to many public records available on the Internet. Many of them specialize in particular types of information, while some offer access to different types of records, typically to professionals in various fields. Some companies sell software with a promise of unlimited access to public records, but may provide nothing more than basic information on how to access already available and generally free public websites.

Each year news media, civic groups, libraries, nonprofits, schools and other interested groups sponsor "Sunshine Week." Sunshine Week occurs in mid-March, coinciding with James Madison's birthday and National Freedom of Information Day on the 16th. The purpose of the week is to highlight the idea that "government functions best when it operates in the open."

In many states, state legislatures are often exempt from public-records laws that apply to state executive officials and local officials. In 2016, the Associated Press made a request for the emails and daily schedules of state legislative leaders (speakers of state Houses and presidents of state Senates) in all 50 states; a majority denied the request.

=== Court records ===
Of particular significance was the evolution of the common-law right "to access court records to inspect and to copy". The expectation inherent in the common law right to access court records is that any person may come to the office of the clerk of the court during business hours and request to inspect court records, with almost instantaneous access. Such right is a central safeguard of the integrity of the courts. Any decision to conceal court records requires a sealing order. The right to access court records is also central to liberty: There is no conceivable way to exercise the Habeas Corpus right, deemed by the late Justice Brennan as "the cornerstone" of the United States Constitution, absent access to court records as public records.

In the United States the common law right to "access court records to inspect and to copy" was reaffirmed by the U.S. Supreme Court in Nixon v Warner Communications, Inc (1978), where the court found various parts of the right to access court records as inherent to the First, Fourth, Sixth, and Fourteenth Amendments. In the United States access to court records is governed by Civil Rights in the Amendments to the United States Constitution, not by the Freedom of Information Act.

As court records become increasingly more accessible online, concerns about the undermining of private information has become a significant issue. In the past, obtaining court records required people to physically go to a courthouse and request documents. However, with the relative ease at which people can now access these records, highly sensitive information (i.e. victim names, Social Security numbers, etc.) are at risk of being publicly exploited.

=== In the United States ===
Access to U.S. national public records is guided by the Freedom of Information Act (FOIA). Requests for access to records pursuant to FOIA may be refused by federal agencies if information requested is subject to exemption, or some information may be redacted (deleted).

In addition to the national FOIA, all states have some form of FOI legislation. For example, Colorado has the Colorado Open Records Act (CORA); in New Jersey the law is known as the Open Public Records Act (OPRA).

There are many degrees of accessibility to public records between states, with some making it fairly easy to request and receive documents, and others with many exemptions and restricted categories of documents. One state that is fairly responsive to public records requests is New York, which utilizes the Committee on Open Government to assist citizens with their requests. A state that was fairly restrictive in how they respond to public records requests is Pennsylvania, where the law formerly presumed that all documents are exempt from disclosure, unless they can be proven otherwise. This was changed by a 2008 bill that went into effect in 2009. The California Public Records Act (California Government Code §§6250-6276.48) covers the arrest and booking records of inmates in the State of California jails and prisons, which are not covered by First Amendment rights (freedom of speech and of the press). Public access to arrest and booking records is seen as a critical safeguard of liberty.

==== Uses of public records ====
With the advent of the Internet and the information age, access to public records in the United States to anyone who wishes to view them has dramatically increased. Third parties such as the information broker industry make regular use of public records to compile readily accessible profiles on millions of people, and may make a profit from the service of compiling and mining the data.

Public record data is used for multiple purposes, such as ensuring that child support payments are made as determined by the courts, assisting credit bureaus in keeping accurate data and helping to pay pension benefits to retirees.

==== Abuse of public records requests ====
U.S. election officials have reported an overwhelming increase in records requests since the 2020 election, primarily from election deniers attempting to disrupt the functioning of local and county election offices. Such requests tend to be unreasonably broad, repetitive, or based on misinformation, leading to what a Colorado official said amounts to "a denial-of-service attack on local government." Local election officials in Florida and Michigan have reported spending 25-70% of staff time in recent years on processing public records requests. In 2022, officials in Maricopa County, Arizona reported one request that required nearly half the election office's staff to spend four days sorting and scanning 20,000 documents.

A review of recent state laws by the Center for Election Innovation & Research found at least 13 states that have sought to protect election staff from the abuse of FOIA requests in several ways, such as creating publicly accessible databases that do not require staff assistance and giving election staff the authority to deny unreasonable or clearly frivolous requests.

==== Access to criminal records in the United States ====
Individual criminal histories are generally considered to be public records in the United States and are often accessed via criminal history background checks, but "access and use of FBI-maintained criminal history record information has been traditionally limited and controlled in large measure to protect the privacy of the individuals to whom the records pertain." The federal Fair Credit Reporting Act imposes "fair information-practice requirements by consumer reporting agencies that report public record information, such as criminal history records, for employment purposes", and some state consumer-protection laws impose more restrictive regulations.

According to the Reporters' Committee for Freedom of the Press, in the United States, arrest records "are generally open to the public unless they concern an active or ongoing investigation. A few states restrict the information that can be obtained from an arrest record, especially when it concerns individuals who were never charged, were acquitted or had their records expunged. Again, the determination will often result in a balancing test comparing the public's interest in disclosure against the individual's privacy interest." By contrast, protective custody and juvenile delinquency records are exempted from most state open-records laws, such that access is "limited to the juvenile, his or her parents or guardians, or other parties directly involved in a legal matter."

==== Destruction of public records ====
In early 2018, the National Archives put up a webpage, "Unauthorized Disposition of Federal Records", to publish all instances of investigations into possible unauthorized destruction of records.

== See also ==
- Public domain
- Freedom of information legislation
- Electronic Frontier Foundation
- Personally identifiable information (PII)
- Privacy laws of the United States
- Public Records Act 1958
- Public records in China
- Public Record Office
- Sunshine Week
- General Register Office
- Use of blockchain in public registry
