= COVID-19 pandemic in China =

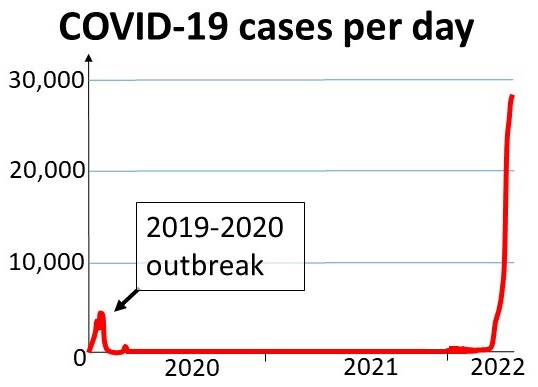
- Rolling average of confirmed COVID-19 cases per day in mainland China
- Disease: COVID-19
- Pathogen: SARS-CoV-2
- Location: China
- First outbreak: Wuhan, Hubei
- Index case: 1 December 2019 (6 years, 11 months and 3 weeks ago)
- Confirmed cases: 99,380,000
- Suspected cases: 1,369,800,000 (~97% of China's population, 2023 study estimate)
- Recovered: 309,259
- Deaths: 122,398 (official count); 1,870,000–2,600,000 (estimate, 2023–2025 studies)
- Vaccinations: 1,318,026,800 (total vaccinated); 1,284,479,600 (fully vaccinated); 3,516,880,600 (doses administered)

The COVID-19 pandemic in China is part of the worldwide pandemic of coronavirus disease 2019 (COVID-19) caused by severe acute respiratory syndrome coronavirus 2 (SARS-CoV-2). China was the first country to experience an outbreak of the disease, the first to impose drastic measures in response (including lockdowns and face mask mandates), and one of the first countries to bring the outbreak under control.

The first wave of the disease manifested as the 2019–2020 COVID-19 outbreak in mainland China, beginning with a cluster of mysterious pneumonia cases, mostly related to the Huanan Seafood Market, in Wuhan, the capital of Hubei province. It was first reported to the local government on 27 December 2019, and published on 31 December. On 8 January 2020, a new coronavirus (SARS-CoV-2) was identified as the cause of the pneumonia by Chinese scientists. By 29 January, the virus was found to have spread to all provinces of mainland China. The virus was first confirmed to have spread to Hong Kong on 23 January 2020, thus originating the COVID-19 pandemic in Hong Kong. Confirmed cases were generally transferred to Princess Margaret Hospital's Infectious Disease Centre for isolation and centralized treatment. On 5 February, after a five-day strike by front-line medical workers, the Hong Kong government closed all but three border control points – Hong Kong International Airport, Shenzhen Bay Control Point, and Hong Kong–Zhuhai–Macau Bridge Control Point remaining open. The first case of the disease in Macau was confirmed on 22 January 2020, originating the COVID-19 pandemic in Macau. The city saw nine more cases by 4 February, but no more cases until 15 March, when imported cases began to appear. Until 26 April 2021, the city had 49 cumulative confirmed cases of COVID-19, all of those having recovered, and no deaths from the disease. Stringent government measures have included the 15-day closure of all 81 casinos in the territory in February; in addition, effective 25 March, the territory disallowed connecting flights at its airport as well as entry by all non-residents (with the exception of residents of mainland China, Hong Kong, and Taiwan), and from 6 April, the Hong Kong–Zhuhai–Macau Bridge was closed to public transport and most other traffic.

== Government response ==
From the start, the Chinese government response pursued a zero-COVID strategy, which aimed to eliminate transmission of the virus within the country and allow resumption of normal economic and social activity; by late 2021 it was one of few countries still pursuing this approach.

On 1 February 2020, the People's Bank of China announced it would temporarily suspend the inclusion of mortgage and credit card payments in the credit record of people impacted by the pandemic. Private financial credit scoring companies, including Sesame Credit, suspended financial credit ratings. Various cities established mechanisms to incentivize companies to provide pandemic relief, with measures including whitelisting (referred to in China as redlisting) for those donating funds and supplies with benefits like simplified administrative procedures, increased policy support, or increased financial support. Following a speech by Xi Jinping emphasizing areas of regulatory compliance, provinces and cities promulgated regulations emphasizing heavy penalties for price hikes, violence against doctors, counterfeit medical supplies, refusal to comply with pandemic prevention measures, and wildlife trade violations.

By late February 2020, the pandemic had been brought under control in most Chinese provinces. On 25 February, the reported number of newly confirmed cases outside mainland China exceeded those reported from within for the first time. By the summer of 2020, widespread community transmission in mainland China had been ended, and restrictions were eased there. As of October 2020 China's economy continued to broaden recovery from the recession during the pandemic, with stable job creation and record international trade growth, although retail consumption was still slower than predicted.

By August 2021, China had donated 700 million vaccine doses abroad, an amount more than all other countries had combined.

In 2022, infection rates increased, and on 3 April 2022, China reported 13,146 new cases of COVID-19 in the past 24 hours, which was the highest single-day total of new cases since the height of the 2020 outbreak.

== Mainland China ==
Based on retrospective analysis published in The Lancet in late January 2020, the first confirmed patient started experiencing symptoms on 1 December 2019, though the South China Morning Post later reported that a retrospective analysis showed the first case may have been a 55-year-old patient from Hubei province as early as 17 November 2019.

The outbreak went unnoticed until 26 December 2019, when Zhang Jixian, director of the Department of Respiratory Medicine at Hubei Xinhua Hospital, noticed a cluster of patients with pneumonia of unknown origin, several of whom had connections to the Huanan Seafood Market. She subsequently alerted the hospital, as well as municipal and provincial health authorities, which issued an alert on 30 December. Results from patient samples obtained on 29–30 December indicated the presence of a novel coronavirus, related to SARS.

Number of cases (blue) and number of deaths (red) on a logarithmic scale. Numbers including Hong Kong and Macau.

On 22 January 2020 Hubei launched a Class 2 Response to Public Health Emergency. Ahead of the Hubei authorities, a Class 1 Response to Public Health Emergency, the highest response level was announced by the mainland province of Zhejiang on 23 January. Around 23 January 2020, stringent measures such as lockdown of Wuhan and the wider Hubei province and face mask mandates were introduced, which lowered and delayed the epidemic peak according to epidemiology modelling. Guangdong and Hunan followed suit later on the day. On the following day, Hubei and 13 other mainland provinces also launched a Class 1 Response. By 29 January 2020, all parts of mainland had initiated a Class 1 Response after Tibet upgraded its response level on that day.

Within three weeks of the first known cases, the government built sixteen large mobile hospitals in Wuhan and sent 40,000 medical staff to the city. Implementing these measures made Chinese perceptions of the government's response more favorable.

Yet, by 29 January, the virus was found to have spread to all provinces of mainland China. Hubei Province party secretary Jiao Chaoliang was removed from office for failing to contain the outbreak. On 31 January 2020 the World Health Organization declared the outbreak a Public Health Emergency of International Concern. A severe shortage of face masks and other protective gear led several countries in February 2020 to send international aid, including medical supplies, to China.

In June 2020, the Sinopharm BIBP vaccine (BBIBP-CorV) was authorized for emergency use in China. On 22 July 2020, Chinese authorities started the emergency use of COVID-19 vaccines. As of July 2022, it was estimated that about 89.7% of the country's population had received a vaccine, and about 56% of the population had received a booster dose.

China was one of a small number of countries that have pursued an elimination strategy, sustaining low case numbers between the 2020 outbreak until early 2022. China's response to the initial Wuhan COVID-19 outbreak has been both praised and criticised. Some have criticised the censorship of information that might be unfavorable for local officials. Observers have attributed this to a culture of institutional censorship affecting the country's press and Internet. The government censored whistleblowers, journalists, and social media posts about the outbreak. During the beginning of the pandemic, the Chinese government made efforts to clamp down on discussion and hide reporting about it. Efforts to fund and control research into the virus's origins and to promote fringe theories about the virus have continued up to the present. In October 2020, The Lancet Infectious Diseases reported: "While the world is struggling to control COVID-19, China has managed to control the pandemic rapidly and effectively." By late 2020, China had contained the first wave of COVID-19.

E-commerce contributed substantially to China's COVID-19 pandemic response by facilitating fast delivery of personal protective equipment, food, and daily use consumer goods during lockdowns.

Ultimately, lockdowns in China were highly effective in reducing the spread of COVID-19; for several years, there was wide public consensus in China that the benefits outweighed the costs.

=== December 2022 surge ===
Nationwide protests broke out in November 2022 amid growing discontent among residents over the zero-COVID policy and the resulting economic costs. Following the easing of the Zero-COVID strategy in December 2022, Beijing reported a surge in COVID-19 infections. It was reported that restaurants and food delivery services had closed due to staff infections, and pharmacies had been emptied of medicine and disinfectant solution. On 22 December, a report by UK research firm Airfinity modelling based on regional Chinese data estimated that more than 5,000 people were dying each day from COVID-19 in China, with cases rising fastest in Beijing and Guangdong province. Internal minutes from a meeting of China's National Health Commission held on 21 December revealed that as many as 248 million people in China might have contracted COVID-19 over the first 20 days of December, and up to 37 million on a single day.

On 23 December 2022 Qingdao's municipal health chief Bo Tao stated that the city was seeing "between 490,000 and 530,000" new infections each day and on the same day, Dongguan's health commission declared on its Weixin account that the city had 250,000 to 300,000 people being infected every day. Officials in Yulin, a city of 3.6 million people in Shaanxi province, logged 157,000 new infections with models estimating more than a third of the city's population had already been infected. On 25 December 2022, the National Health Commission announced that it would no longer report daily COVID-19 figures, and Zhejiang provincial government said it was battling around a million new infections a day and expected the number to be doubling in days ahead.

== Special administrative regions ==
=== Hong Kong ===
Hong Kong was relatively unscathed by the first wave of the COVID-19 outbreak and had a flatter epidemic curve than most other places, which observers consider remarkable given its status as an international transport hub. Furthermore, its proximity to China and its millions of mainland visitors annually would make it vulnerable. Some experts now believe the habit of wearing masks in public since the SARS epidemic of 2003 may have helped keep its confirmed infections at 845, with four deaths, by the beginning of April. In a study published in April 2020 in the Lancet, the authors expressed their belief that border restrictions, quarantine and isolation, social distancing, and behavioural changes such as wearing masks likely all played a part in the containment of the disease up to the end of March. Others attributed the success to critical thinking of citizens who have become accustomed to distrusting the competence and political motivations of the government, the World Health Organization, and the Chinese Communist Party.

After a much smaller second wave in late March and April 2020 caused by overseas returnees rushing to beat mandatory quarantine, Hong Kong saw a substantial uptick in COVID cases in July, with more than a hundred cases being reported several days in a row until early August. Experts attributed this third wave to imported cases – sea crew, aircrew members, and domestic helpers made up the majority of 3rd wave infections. In late November 2020, the city entered a fourth wave, called "severe" by Chief Executive Carrie Lam. The initial driver behind the fourth wave was a group of dance clubs in which wealthy, predominantly female Hong Kongers danced together and had dance lessons with mostly younger male dance instructors. Measures taken in response included a suspension of school classroom teaching until the end of the year, and an order for restaurants to seat only two persons per table and close at 10:00 p.m. taking effect on 2 December; a further tightening of restrictions saw, among other measures, a 6 pm closing time of restaurants starting from 10 December, and a mandate for authorities to order partial lockdowns in locations with multiple cases of COVID-19 until all residents were tested. From late January 2021, the government pursued repeatedly locked down residential buildings to conduct mass testing. A free mass vaccination program with the Sinovac vaccine and Pfizer–BioNTech vaccine was launched on 26 February 2021. The government sought to counter the vaccine hesitancy by material incentives, which led to an acceleration of vaccinations in June.

Hong Kong is one of few countries and territories to pursue a zero-COVID elimination strategy, by essentially closing all its borders and, until February 2022, subjecting even mild and asymptomatic cases to hospitalisation, and sometimes isolation extending over several weeks. The fifth, Omicron variant driven wave of the pandemic emerging in late December 2021 caused the health system to be stretched to its limits, the mandatory hospitalization to be abandoned, and led several experts to question the zero-COVID strategy. Some even considered it counterproductive, due to it having nourished hopes that the city would eventually become free of the virus, and thus having led to a low COVID-19 vaccination rate in the city. Most of the deaths in the fifth wave were among the unvaccinated elderly.

=== Macau ===
At a press conference in February 2020, Ho Iat Seng welcomed mainland Chinese people to make use of Macau's free medical service. This created controversy online, with users worrying that people from the mainland would come to Macau and spread the virus. Afterwards, Secretary for Administration and Justice Cheong Weng Chon (張永春) said that any patients from outside Macau who had COVID-19 would need to pay their own medical bills; they would be able to apply for a fee waiver, and the government would make a decision based on their financial situation and effects on the public.

When Guangdong became the province with the second-most cases in China, Macau still had tens of thousands of people going to and from Zhuhai every day. Many people asked for the border to be closed, but the government repeatedly said that a complete closure was not possible. Ho Iat Seng said, "If we closed all the ports of entry, who would remove the trash? Who would handle security? How would we get fresh produce? These are the issues we're thinking about."

== Republic of China (Taiwan) ==
Since its establishment after the Chinese Civil War, the PRC has claimed the territories governed by the Republic of China (ROC), a separate political entity today commonly known as Taiwan, as a part of its territory. The Chinese government regards the island of Taiwan as its Taiwan Province. Historically, the Taiwanese government has also stated that it is the legitimate government of all of China.

The virus was confirmed to have spread to Taiwan on 21 January 2020, with the first case being a 50-year-old woman who had been teaching in Wuhan, China. The Taiwanese government integrated data from the national health care system, immigration, and customs authorities to aid in the identification and response to the virus. Government efforts are coordinated through the National Health Command Center (NHCC) of the Taiwan Centers for Disease Control, established to aid in disaster management for epidemics following the 2003 SARS outbreak. The Journal of the American Medical Association says Taiwan engaged in 124 discrete action items to prevent the spread of the disease, including early screening of flights from mainland China and the tracking of individual cases.

Starting 19 March 2020, foreign nationals were barred from entering Taiwan with some exceptions such as those carrying out the remainder of business contracts and those holding valid Alien Resident Certificates, diplomatic credentials, or other official documentation and special permits. Restrictions have since been relaxed for foreign university students and those seeking medical treatment in Taiwan, subject to prior government approval. All who are admitted into the country must complete a fourteen-day quarantine upon arrival, except for business travelers from countries determined to be at low or moderate risk, who are subject to five- or seven-day quarantines and must submit to a COVID-19 test.

In response to the worldwide spike in cases in October and November 2020, Taiwan announced that all travelers to and transiting through Taiwan, regardless of nationality, origin, or purpose, must submit a negative COVID-19 test performed within three working days of arrival. Exceptions are granted to travelers responding to family emergencies or arriving from countries where on-demand or self-paid tests are unavailable, but they are required to be seated apart from other passengers and take a self-paid test immediately on arrival in Taiwan.

In 2020, the pandemic had a smaller impact in Taiwan than in most other industrialized countries, with a total of seven deaths. The number of active cases in this first wave peaked on 6 April 2020, at 307 cases, the overwhelming majority of which were imported. Taiwan's handling of the outbreak has received international praise for its effectiveness in quarantining people.

However, an outbreak among Taiwanese crew members of the state-owned China Airlines in late April 2021 led to a sharp surge in cases, mainly in the Greater Taipei area, from mid May. In response, the closure of all schools in the area from kindergarten to high schools was mandated for two weeks, and national borders were closed for at least a month to those without a residence permit, among other measures. In addition to a low testing rate and the recent shortening of the quarantine period for pilots to just three days, Taiwanese medical experts said that they had expected the flare-up due to the emergence of more transmissible variants of the coronavirus (the Alpha variant was found in many of those linked to the China Airlines cluster), combined with the slow progress of Taiwan's vaccination campaign. Critics linked the latter issue to several factors, including Taiwan's strategy of focusing on its own vaccine development and production, making it less ready to quickly buy overseas vaccines once those became available; and hesitation among residents to get vaccinated due to previously low case numbers. Additionally, heavy reporting on rare side effects of the AstraZeneca vaccine was believed to have played a role. Demand for vaccines greatly increased, however, with the surge in cases from May 2021.

As of 23 April 2022, 14,214,319 tests had been conducted in Taiwan, of which 51,298 were confirmed cases, including 856 deaths.
