= Amaney Jamal =

Political scientist

Amaney A. Jamal
- Born: December 30, 1970 (age 55)
- Awards: Carnegie Scholar; American Academy of Arts and Sciences (2020)

Academic background
- Education: University of California, Los Angeles (BA); University of Michigan (PhD)

Academic work
- Discipline: Political science
- Institutions: Princeton University
- Notable works: Barriers to Democracy: The Other Side of Social Capital in Palestine and the Arab World (2007); Race and Arab Americans before and after 9/11 (2008); Of Empires and Citizens: Pro-American Democracy or No Democracy at All? (2012)

Amaney A. Jamal (born December 30, 1970) is a Palestinian-American scholar of Middle Eastern politics who is currently the Edwards S. Sanford Professor of Politics and Director of the Mamdouha S. Bobst Center for Peace and Justice at Princeton University. Jamal earned her bachelor's degree in politics at UCLA in 1993, followed by her PhD in political science from the University of Michigan. A Carnegie Scholar, Jamal specializes in democratization and civic engagement in the Arab world as well as Muslim and Arab civic engagement in the US. She currently directs the Workshop on Arab Political Development at Princeton University, is the principal investigator of the "Arab Barometer Project", which was awarded the Best Data set in the field of Comparative Politics in 2010, and is senior advisor on the PEW Research Center Projects focusing on Islam in America and Global Islam. Jamal has been interviewed on numerous programs throughout her career including MSNBC, Al Jazeera, and the Washington Post to discuss issues ranging from the Palestinian–Israeli conflict to politics of the Arab world at large.

Jamal was elected as a member of the American Academy of Arts and Sciences in 2020. Jamal has been elected the Dean of the School of Public and International Affairs at Princeton University in 2021.

== Publications ==
- Amaney Jamal (2007). Barriers to Democracy: The Other Side of Social Capital in Palestine and the Arab World. Princeton, NJ: Princeton UP. (Winner of the Best Book Award in Comparative Democratization at the American Political Science Association in 2008)
- Amaney Jamal and Nadine Christine (2008). Race and Arab Americans before and after 9/11. Syracuse, NY: Syracuse UP.
- Amaney Jamal, Wayne Baker, Sally Howell, Ann Chih Lin, Andrew Shryock, Ron Stockton, Mark Tessler (2009). Citizenship and Crisis: Arab Detroit After 9/11. New York, NY: Russel Sage Foundation.
- Amaney Jamal (2012). Of Empires and Citizens: Pro-American Democracy or No Democracy at All? Princeton, NJ: Princeton UP.
