= Afrobarometer =

African social sciences research network

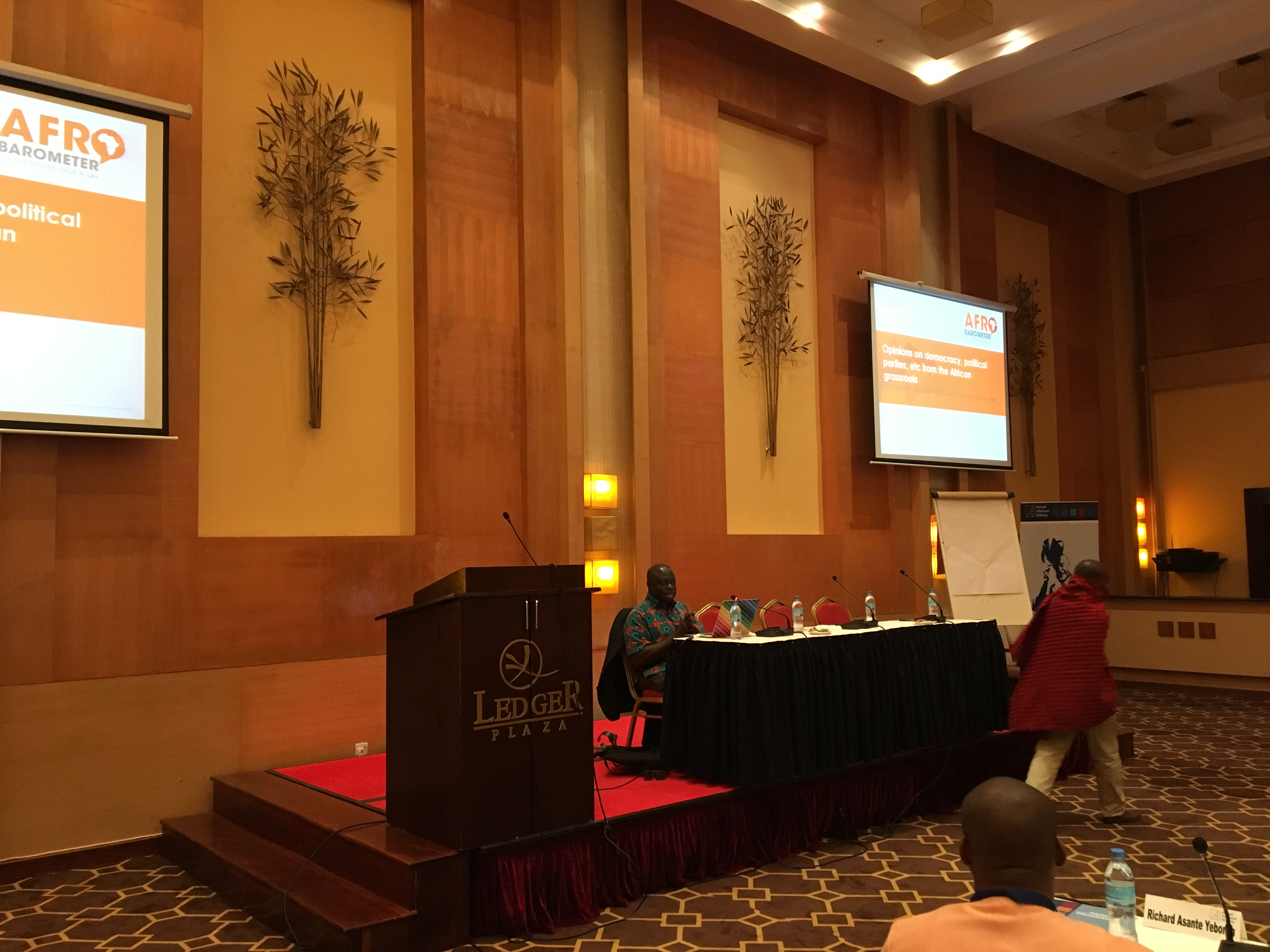
Afrobarometer executive director, Prof E Gyimah-Boadi speaking at a conference in November 2017 in Tanzania

The Afrobarometer is a pan-African, independent, non-partisan research network that measures public attitudes on economic, political, and social matters in Africa. Its secretariat headquarters are in Accra, Ghana, registered as a limited company by guarantee by the Registrar-General’s Department of the Republic of Ghana.

== Surveys ==
The surveys are carried out by region through a partnership of the Ghana Center for Democratic Development (CDD Ghana), the Institute for Justice and Reconciliation in South Africa, and the Institute for Development Studies at the University of Nairobi. The Institute for Democracy, Citizenship and Public Policy in Africa at the University of Cape Town and the Department of Political Science at Michigan State University are technical partners.

Afrobarometer surveys are conducted in more than 40 African countries and are repeated on a regular cycle. The Afrobarometer is carried out in Algeria, Benin, Botswana, Burkina Faso, Burundi, Cameroon, Cape Verde, Côte d'Ivoire, Egypt, Eswatini, Ethiopia, Gabon, Ghana, Guinea, Kenya, Lesotho, Liberia, Madagascar, Malawi, Mali, Mauritius, Morocco, Mozambique, Namibia, Niger, Nigeria, São Tomé and Príncipe, Senegal, Sierra Leone, South Africa, South Sudan, Sudan, Tanzania, Togo, Tunisia, Uganda, Zambia, and Zimbabwe.

The Afrobarometer currently covers 21 survey topics: Conflict and crime, Democracy, Elections, Gender Equality, Governance, Identity, Macroeconomics and Markets, Political Participation, Poverty, Public Services, Social Capital, Tolerance, Access to Justice, Citizenship, China, Energy Supply, and Pan-Africanism/Regionalism.

=== Methodology ===
Afrobarometer achieves this measurement through a series of face-to-face interviews with a random sample of 1,200, 1,600 or 2,400 people in each country. Because the instrument asks standard set of questions, countries can be systematically compared. Trends in public attitudes are tracked over time. Results are shared with decision makers, policy advocates, civic educators, journalists, researchers, donors and investors, as well as average Africans who wish to become more informed and active citizens.

== History ==
Afrobarometer was founded by Professor Robert Mattes of the University of Cape Town (while based at IDASA) now at Strathclyde University, Emeritus Professor Michael Bratton of Michigan State University and Emeritus Professor Emmanuel Gyimah-Boadi of CDD Ghana and University of Ghana, Legon in 1999. Mattes is now senior advisor at Afrobarometer, Bratton is a former director of Afrobarometer and now senior advisor and a board member. Gyimah-Boadi is the chairman of the board and Dr Joseph Asunka the CEO.

The organisation has conducted nine main rounds of surveys, covering a total of 41 African countries, as well as a number of individual surveys.

Round 11 surveys launched in 2026. Round 10 surveys ran from 2024 to 2025. Round 9 surveys ran from 2022 to early 2023. Round 8 surveys began in the latter half of 2019 and completed in late 2021. Round 7 surveys started in December 2016 and completed in June 2018, covering 34 countries. Round 6 surveys began in March 2014 and ended in December 2015, covering 36 countries. Round 5 surveys took place in 35 countries between 2011 and September 2013. Round 4 surveys took place in 20 countries between March 2008 and June 2009. Round 5 surveys began in October 2011. Round 3 surveys were conducted in 18 countries from March 2005 through February 2006. Round 2 surveys were conducted from May 2002 through October 2003 in 16 countries. (Zimbabwe survey was carried out in April and May 2004). Round 1 surveys conducted from July 1999 through June 2001 in 12 countries. Predecessor surveys in 1993 in Zambia and 1994 in South Africa were carried out by the Institute for Democracy in Africa (one of the founding institutions of Afrobarometer).

New subnationally geocoded data covering 1999-2015 are now available through partnership with the development research lab AidData at the College of William and Mary for Rounds 1-6.

Afrobarometer has been consistently been ranked as one of the world's Best Institutional Collaboration involving 2 or more Think Tanks by the Global Go To Think Tank Index Report published by the Lauder Institute, University of Pennsylvania

== See also ==
- Asian Barometer Survey
- Economy of Africa
- Eurobarometer
- Arab Barometer
- LAPOP Latin American Public Opinion Project
- World Values Survey
