= Asian Barometer Survey =

Comparative survey of 18 Asian states and territories

The Asian Barometer Survey is a comparative survey of 18 Asian states and territories. These include Japan, Mongolia, South Korea, Taiwan, Hong Kong, China, Philippines, Thailand, Vietnam, Cambodia, Singapore, Indonesia, Malaysia, India, Pakistan, Bangladesh, Sri Lanka, and Nepal. It is organised by the Academia Sinica and National Taiwan University. Its founders are members of the Global Barometer Survey group. The data is gathered with face-to-face interviews, which cover topics ranging from economic conditions and social capital, to political participation, partisanship, traditionalism, and trust in institutions.

The organization has conducted 5 rounds of surveys: round 1 took place from 2001 to 2003, round 2 - 2005 to 2008, round 3 - 2010 to 2012, round 4 - 2014 to 2016, round 5 - 2018 to 2022, round 6 - 2021 to 2024. Round 7 is currently taking place, started in 2025.

At least 97 papers have been published using data from the survey, including those of Johns Hopkins University Press, UC Irvine, Western Kentucky University, Seoul National University, and the University of Sussex. The data has also been referenced in conferences held by the Freeman Spogli Institute for International Studies and the National Endowment for Democracy.

== See also ==
- Afrobarometer
- Arab Barometer
- Eurobarometer
- Latinobarómetro
