= Baihe.com =

Chinese online dating service

Baihe.com is a Chinese online dating service, founded in 2005, run by the Baihe Network Company. It uses Sesame Credit data as part of its service. In December 2015, Baihe absorbed its largest competitor, jiayuan.com, in a merger.
