= Mike Elgan =

American journalist (born 1961)

Mike Elgan (born December 3, 1961) is an American journalist, blogger, columnist and podcaster. He is a columnist for publications including Computerworld, Cult of Android, Cult of Mac, Forbes, Datamation, eWeek and Baseline.

== Career ==
Elgan was chief editor for the technology publication Windows Magazine. He has written opinion columns for several publications, and in February 2013 had 2 million "followers" on Google+. He has been featured or quoted by the BBC, CNN, FOX News, The New York Times, Wall Street Journal, and NPR.

He began hosting the podcast Tech News Today in 2014. Elgan left Tech News Today in late 2015. His last episode on December 7, 2015. Elgan announced his departure on his Google+ account.
