= Arab Barometer =

Research network focused on MENA public opinion

The Arab Barometer is a nonpartisan research network that provides insight into the social, political, and economic attitudes and values of ordinary citizens across the Arab world. It has been conducting public opinion surveys in the Middle East and North Africa (MENA) since 2006. It is the largest repository of publicly available data on the views of men and women in the MENA region. The project has conducted more than 70,000 interviews over five waves of surveys across 15 countries in MENA since 2006. The project is organized through a partnership between Princeton University, the University of Michigan, and regional partners across the Middle East and North Africa. The project is governed by a Steering Committee including academics and researchers from MENA and the United States.

== History ==
The project was founded by Dr. Amaney Jamal (Princeton University) and Dr. Mark Tessler (University of Michigan). The first wave was carried out across seven countries from 2006 to 2007. Fieldwork was overseen by Dr. Fares Braizat of the Center for Strategic Studies (CSS) at the University of Jordan. The second wave covered 10 countries (2010–11) and spanned the events of the Arab uprisings. The result of the revolutions in Egypt and Tunisia resulted in the expansion of coverage to include these cases. Fieldwork was overseen by Dr. Mohammad Al Masri of CSS. The third wave (2012–14) was conducted in 12 countries and fieldwork was led by Dr. Walid al-Khatib and Dr. Sara Ababneh of CSS.

The project was initially funded by the United States State Department's Middle East Partnership Initiative.

In 2014, Dr. Michael Robbins was appointed as project director. Meanwhile, the project transitioned to a model with core partners across the region, including the Center for Strategic Studies at the University of Jordan, the Palestinian Center for Policy and Survey Research, and One to One for Research and Polling (Tunisia).

The fourth wave was carried out across 7 countries in 2016. The fifth wave (2018-19) was carried out across 12 countries and included larger sample sizes (2,400 respondents) in most countries. In total, more than 25,000 surveys were carried out making this the largest and most in depth publicly available survey ever carried out across the Middle East and North Africa. The survey was conducted in partnership with the BBC Arabic. Results were also covered in major media outlets across the world including The Economist, The Washington Post, The New York Times, The Guardian, Al Jazeera, Deutsche Welle, and The Daily Star, among others.

The sixth wave (2020-2021) spanned the height of the COVID-19 pandemic and interviews were conducted in seven countries by computer-assisted telephone interviewing (CATI). The seventh wave (2021-2022) returned to in-person interviewing via computer-assisted personal interviewing (CAPI). The wave covered 12 countries across the region including more than 26,000 interviews. The results were covered extensively in the media, including by the BBC Arabic, The Washington Post, The Arab News, The Wilson Center, The Middle East Eye, Foreign Policy, The Atlantic Council, Newsweek, and Deutsche Welle, among others.

== Methodology and data ==
All interviews are conducted with citizens of a country who are eighteen years of age or older. Sampling is done scientifically to ensure that results are representative for the country. Surveys are conducted face-to-face in the respondent's place of residence. Arab Barometer data is available to the public at no charge. The survey questionnaires and data downloads are available on its website.

Surveys were designed to detect attitudes and viewpoints that might support democratisation, including toleration, respect for diversity, civic engagement and trust. The political theorist Timothy Mitchell has criticised the Arab Barometer project's methodology, arguing that it assumes without basis that the presence of a civic culture is likely to provide a basis for democratisation, when numerous examples exist of democratisation being prevented by the presence of strong civic cultures among elites who seek to protect their own status.

== Waves ==
Wave 1 survey (2006–2007) in 7 countries: Algeria, Bahrain (2009), Jordan, Lebanon, Morocco, Palestine and Yemen.

Wave 2 survey (2010–2011) in 10 countries: Algeria, Egypt, Iraq, Jordan, Lebanon, Palestine, Saudi Arabia, Sudan, Tunisia, and Yemen.

Wave 3 survey (2012–2014) in 12 countries: Algeria, Egypt, Iraq, Jordan, Kuwait, Lebanon, Libya, Morocco, Palestine, Sudan, Tunisia, and Yemen.

Wave 4 survey (2016) in 7 countries: Algeria, Egypt, Jordan, Lebanon, Morocco, Palestine, and Tunisia.

Wave 5 survey (2018–2019) in 12 countries: Algeria, Egypt, Iraq, Jordan, Kuwait, Lebanon, Libya, Morocco, Palestine, Sudan, Tunisia, and Yemen.

Wave 6 survey (2020–2021) in 7 countries: Algeria, Iraq, Jordan, Lebanon, Libya, Morocco, and Tunisia.

Wave 7 survey (2021–2022) in 12 countries: Algeria, Egypt, Iraq, Jordan, Kuwait, Lebanon, Libya, Mauritania, Morocco, Palestine, Sudan, and Tunisia.

Wave 8 survey (2023–present) in 8 countries: Iraq, Jordan, Kuwait, Lebanon, Mauritania, Morocco, Palestine, and Tunisia

== Steering Committee ==
- Dr. Zaid Eyadat (University of Jordan)
- Dr. Amaney Jamal (Princeton University)
- Youssef Meddeb (One to One for Research and Polling)
- Dr. Michael Robbins (Princeton University)
- Dr. Khalil Shikaki (Palestinian Center for Policy and Survey Research)
- Dr. Mark Tessler (University of Michigan)

== Media and news ==
Arab Barometer has been featured in various media and news outlets including USA Today, CBC News, The New York Times, BBC News, Die Zeit, N1, CNN, and Foreign Affairs.

== See also ==
- Eurobarometer
- LAPOP Latin American Public Opinion Project
- Afrobarometer
- Roper Center for Public Opinion Research
