= Zhima Credit =

Ant Group consumer credit scoring program

- 芝麻信用
- Formation: 2015; 11 years ago
- Location: China
- Services: Credit scoring
- Parent organization: Alibaba Group
- Website: www.xin.xin

Zhima Credit (Chinese: 芝麻信用; pinyin: Zhīma Xìnyòng; also known as Sesame Credit) is a private company-run credit scoring and loyalty program system developed by Ant Group, an affiliate of Alibaba Group. It uses data from Alibaba's services to compile its score. Customers receive a score based on a variety of factors based on social media interactions and purchases carried out on Alibaba Group websites or paid for using its affiliate Ant Financial's Alipay mobile wallet. The rewards of having a high score include easier access to loans from Ant Financial and having a more trustworthy profile on e-commerce sites within the Alibaba Group. It has frequently been confused with the Social Credit System.

== History ==
China has a much lower rate of credit use than developed markets. As a result, it lacks the associated credit reports.

Zhima Credit was introduced on 28 January 2015. It was the first credit agency in China to use a score system for individual users, using both online and offline information. It was developed when the People's Bank of China lifted the restrictions and let non-bank institutes conduct personal credit information operations.

== Usage ==
A higher Zhima credit score increases the availability of microloans from Alibaba (for example, for the Taobao platform). It can also have some benefits outside of Alibaba platforms, like potentially waiving deposits for hotel bookings or bicycle rentals from businesses that partner with Alipay.

All Taobao buyers and sellers with a sufficiently high Zhima credit score can vote and express their opinions on proposed changes to Taobao rules.

Baihe.com, a Chinese matchmaking company, uses Zhima Credit data as part of its service.

== Technology platform ==
In 2015, Zhima Credit published information on the methodology behind its currently running beta version.

Zhima Credit's scoring system is roughly modeled after FICO scoring in the United States and Schufa in Germany.

=== Data collection ===
The corporate network of Zhima Credit, led by the Alibaba Group, spans over insurance, loan, historical payment, dating, shopping and mobility data. It collects data from all sources by utilizing the regulatory freedom it built from objects and social networks, public and private institutions and offline and online. The system is powered by "data from more than 300 million real-name registered users and 37 million small businesses that buy and sell on Alibaba Group marketplaces". Due to Zhima Credit's close collaboration with the government, it also has access to all public documents, such as official identity and financial records.

=== Data distribution ===
Zhima Credit emphasizes its strict privacy and data protection, ensured through encryption and segregation. The firm also states that data is only gathered upon knowledge and consent of the user. According to Ant Financial, users' scores can currently only be shared with their authorization or by themselves.

=== Data Structure ===
Big data and behavioral analytics are building blocks for the system. Data fragments are classified into five categories:

- Credit History: Reflects users' past payment history and level of debt
- Fulfillment Capacity: Shows users' ability to fulfill contract obligations
- Personal Characteristics: Examine the extent and accuracy of personal information
- Behavior and Preferences: Reveal users' online behavior
- Interpersonal Relationships: Reflect the online characteristics of a users' friends

The specifications of the algorithm that determine the classification, as well as the analytical parameters and indicators remain confidential. It is unclear is whether data is structured to build in tolerances for errors, for example the likelihood of a unit of data being false or from an unreliable source.

=== Data visualization ===
The five categories that Zhima Credit classifies its data into, have different weightings attached to them. Based on those, an algorithm determines a citizen's final citizen score, ranked among others. The scores in the ranking range from 350 (lowest trustworthiness) to 950 (highest trustworthiness). From 600 up, one can gain privileges, while lower scorers will revoke them. According to current plans, the final score and ranking will be publicly available.

== Social Credit System misconceptions ==
Zhima Credit has frequently been mistaken for the Social Credit System.

In 2015, the PBOC designated eight private companies to pilot personal credit reporting (zhengxin) mechanisms. Because the pilot programs were zhengxin mechanisms, they had little connection to the idea of social credit more broadly. Zhima Credit was one of the pilot zhengxin mechanisms. It was an opt-in scoring initiative proposed to assess users' credit worthiness even if those users lacked formal credit history. It did not include standard industry metrics like income or debts, instead it assessed factors like user spending ability and whether users showed up for travel bookings.

Following the release of Zhima Credit, there was significant media speculation that it might turn into a national social credit system by 2020. This did not occur. Zhima Credit and the other pilot initiatives were never linked to the broader financial system. Zhima Credit did not prove to be an effective credit evaluation mechanism because the data showed no statistically significant link between its metrics and a user's ability to repay loans.

In one interview, Alibaba's technology director suggested that people who played too many video games might be considered less trustworthy. Various news outlets around the world incorrectly suggested that people could lose social credit for playing too many video games. No video game playing metric was ever implemented.

Ultimately Zhima Credit became a loyalty program that rewarded users for using Alibaba services and shopping platforms. PBOC decided not to extend the credit licenses of the eight private pilot programs from 2015.

== See also ==
- Tencent – also offers a credit scoring system
