= E-participation =

Technology-assisted citizen participation in government processes

Electronic participation (e-participation) refers to the use of ICT in facilitating citizen participation in government-related processes, encompassing areas such as administration, service delivery, decision-making, and policy-making. As such, e-participation shares close ties with e-government and e-governance participation. The term's emergence aligns with the digitization of citizen interests and interactions with political service providers, primarily due to the proliferation of e-government.

E-participation can be further defined as a mechanism that augments and intensifies political participation, enabling citizens to connect with each other and their elected representatives through information and communication technologies (ICTs). This comprehensive definition encompasses all stakeholders in democratic decision-making processes, not merely top-down government initiatives centered on citizens. E-participation is a significant component of e-democracy, involving various entities such as governments, media, political parties, interest groups, civil society organizations, international governmental organizations, as well as citizens and voters in the political processes at the local, national, and global levels.

The intricacies of e-participation processes arise from the diversity of participation domains, the variety of involved stakeholders, differing levels of engagement, and the various stages in policy making.

== History ==
Originating in the early 2000s, the term "e-participation" emerged from the idea of promoting civic involvement in public policies via information and communication technologies (ICTs). The evolution of e-participation generally hinges on three factors: the progression of ICTs, the expansion of e-democracy, and the advancement of e-government.

The greatest catalyst for the surge in e-participation is the advancement of ICTs, which have facilitated improved collaboration between the public and the government. The development of CSCW (Computer Supported Cooperative Work) and groupware, designed to foster collaborative environments, has significantly enhanced human interaction mediated by ICTs in both professional and social settings. Consequently, e-participation has emerged as a societal activity, involving collaboration among politicians, administrative figures, and the public.

The evolution of e-democracy since the late 1990s has significantly influenced the advent of e-participation. This interest quickly expanded from e-voting to various forms of ICT-assisted and ICT-enabled interactions between governments and citizens. These interactions encompass both direct methods like consultations, lobbying, petitioning, and polling, as well as indirect ones, such as campaigning and community informatics conducted outside the direct government purview. The extent of participation allowed in democratic processes is often determined by the institutional conditions of the chosen democratic model, such as direct or representative democracy or any hybrid forms.

The progression in e-government towards increasingly intricate service-delivery is another factor contributing to the rise of e-participation. Complex services necessitate extensive interaction, including searching, option selection based on various criteria, outcome calculations, notifications, inquiries, and complaints. While numerous ICT tools exist for these tasks, ranging from FAQs to call centers, there remains a need for their coordination into user-friendly yet robust toolsets for client-organization encounters. Given the complexity of interactions in such contexts, and the goals to be achieved, these arenas become social spaces for ICT-supported participation.

== On the definition ==
Participation is a goal-oriented process involving decision-making and control. In the contexts of political science and management theory, e-participation refers to the direct public involvement in political, economic, or management decisions. As participation grows complex, decision-making becomes essential, with every participatory process potentially influencing the rule system governing the activities. In cases where service processes become intricate, their implementation relies not only on political decisions but also on practical solutions.

Instead of passively absorbing information disseminated by the media and government, engaging in participation transforms an individual into an active citizen, contributing to a democratic society. When these practical actions are integrated into government e-service systems, they influence decision-making, as later changes become challenging once existing procedures have been implemented in ICT systems and government agencies' procedures. Several theories, such as structuration theory, institutional theory, and actor-network theory, examine institutionalization, exploring how operational methods become established or rejected, and how established methods increasingly influence societal norms for task completion. From a citizen's perspective, the capability approach is employed to understand individual behaviors. This method enables institutions to identify normative capabilities that can enhance citizens' opportunities to participate in the governance process.

== E-participation Index ==
The E-Participation Index (EPI) is a tool developed by the UN Department of Economic and Social Affairs. It serves as a supplementary index to the UN E-Government Survey and is used to assess the effectiveness of online services that facilitate information exchange and interaction between government and citizens, and citizen involvement in policy and decision-making. The EPI evaluates the extent to which a government provides information to its constituents, involves citizens in policy design, and empowers citizens in decision-making processes, forming the framework of "e-information", "e-consultation", and "e-decision making". The index is calculated by subtracting the lowest e-participation score from the e-participation score of the country in question, and then dividing this by the range of scores for all countries. The resulting index score serves as a foundational measure of a government's inclusivity.

A range of tools and models linked to Web 2.0 have emerged that can either be used directly or inspire the creation of architectures for e-participation. Notably, the rise of online communities focused on the creation of valuable products suggests the feasibility of designing socially mediating technologies to support collaborations between the public and government.

=== Tools for participation ===
Social networking services, including popular media platforms and blogs, have established online platforms that enable people to connect and engage in interactive activities. These online platforms have facilitated social activities such as interactions between citizens and government agencies. Governments have increasingly utilized social networking to keep abreast of public trends and identify political issues of significant interest to the public. Widely used platforms such as Twitter and Facebook have empowered users to actively participate in politics online by expressing their political perspectives and organizing movements to highlight key issues. The rapid sharing and response mechanisms enabled by social networking platforms have emerged as a crucial tool for e-participation, facilitating citizen involvement in decision-making and encouraging government agencies to address public concerns proactively.

Wikis offer another online collaborative platform for individuals to participate, albeit not directly with politicians or government administrators. The dynamic and collaborative nature of wikis allows citizens to contribute their expertise on various topics and share that knowledge with others. This platform promotes debates and interactions among contributors, ensuring that the content is regularly updated to provide the most recent and comprehensive understanding of each subject. Wikis can serve as tools that facilitate and inspire e-participation, enabling people to highlight various movements and issues and educating others about potential impacts.

The use of e-participation can have huge influence in modern times due to the ability for information and ideas to spread across social media platforms. Notably the Arab Spring (2010-2012), where social media allowed for the Middle Eastern and North African nations involved to get around government censorship and to form groups and spread information across the internet.

=== Mechanisms ===
- Electronic voting typically takes two forms: physical e-voting, such as electronic voting machines at polling stations, and remote e-voting via the Internet. Remote e-voting is a potent tool for e-participation as it provides the convenience of voting from any location at any time, thereby reducing the time and cost associated with voting. This convenience can increase voter turnout and civic engagement by making it easier for citizens to express their support for various policies and political figures. The advent of blockchain technology has significantly improved the security and transparency of electronic voting. The decentralized nature of blockchain technologies holds potential for transforming future electronic voting models. However, e-voting is not without drawbacks. Most notably, it can exacerbate the digital divide between individuals of different socioeconomic backgrounds and age groups, as the technology may not be universally accessible. Thus, e-voting could potentially alienate those lacking access to technology or stable internet connections, possibly hindering rather than promoting citizen engagement.
- Internet petitions have emerged as a popular platform for citizens to engage in policy review and issue petitioning. These petitions offer a flexible and easy means to voice concerns on pressing social and political issues, enhancing citizen engagement and enabling administrations to respond more effectively to the population's needs. Government-created petitioning platforms like We The People are directly linked to administrative officials who can address and advance important movements. Internet petitions foster increased citizen participation, contributing to a more inclusive relationship between the government and society.
- Quadratic voting is a burgeoning technology that utilizes blockchain technology to enhance e-participation. This method allows citizens to express the intensity of their feelings about a policy. It works by assigning individuals a set number of tokens, which they can then use to vote multiple times on policies they feel strongly about, thereby expressing urgency or passion. Quadratic voting introduces greater flexibility and interactivity into the voting process. The potential to express the "strength" of voters' voices and opinions more distinctly in the voting process enhances citizen engagement and provides more nuanced feedback on particular issues and policies than a traditional voting system.
- Reputation systems
- Transparency tools (social translucence mechanisms)
- Political literacy can be improved through e-participation, social media allows for passive consumption of information therefor reducing the gap between those who actively engage in politics and those who don't. The improved literacy will therefore increase participation in politics as people have a better understanding of how political systems work and also how they effect them this is supported as 51% of Americans before the 2004 US presidential election came across political information online unintentionally.

=== Tracking and analysis tools ===
- Digital traces
- Data mining
- Data visualization
- Simulations, such as agent-based social simulation

=== Crowdsourcing ===
Crowdsourcing exemplifies e-participation in action. Generally defined as soliciting a group of individuals via the World Wide Web to solve problems, this platform can gather human resources from the furthest and most unexpected places, contributing to the overall pool of intellectual capital. Crowdsourcing can be incorporated into various stages of the policy-making process, unfolding at the information, consultation, and active participation levels.

At the information level, a one-way relationship exists where participants receive information from the government. The consultation level facilitates a two-way interaction, allowing citizens to provide their inputs, feedback, and reactions. Active participation refers to deeper involvement, with citizens directly contributing to policy content formulation. This degree of e-participation is increasingly facilitated through tools such as online petitions, e-referendums, e-panels, citizen e-juries, and participatory GIS, among others.

== Challenges of e-participation ==
The primary challenge to e-participation is the prevailing digital divide. E-participation heavily depends on access to modern technologies and stable internet connections. Often, it necessitates advanced digital literacy, such as the skills to digitally scrutinize policy proposals and contribute input in a digital environment. Moreover, knowledge of internet safety and effective online collaboration are crucial for successfully navigating e-participation tools. These requirements, together with physical access to technology, present barriers to individuals of varying socioeconomic levels, and particularly those unable to afford access to these technologies. Consequently, the digital divide impedes and restricts the ability of certain groups to express their views, excluding them from participation, and ultimately contradicting the intended purpose of e-participation.

== European E-participation Initiatives ==
=== European E-participation Preparatory Actions ===
The E-participation Preparatory Actions were implemented from 2006 to 2008 to enhance citizens' participation in the legislative process through online tools. Initiated by the EU on January 1, 2007, these actions consisted of interconnected projects designed to boost citizens' awareness and engagement in the legislative process, from the initial drafting to regional and local implementation.

Each project was targeted at enhancing the transparency, understandability, and accessibility of legislative language and procedures for citizens. Additionally, they focused on improving the communication of legislation to augment citizens' participation and contribution in formulating and implementing laws.

To date, 21 projects have been initiated and financially supported. These projects actively involve the European Parliament, national parliaments, and local and regional authorities. Cutting-edge ICT tools are utilized to streamline the creation of legal texts, including translation into various languages and drafting of amendments, while making these texts more accessible and comprehensible to non-experts. Innovative digital technologies are also employed to provide citizens with easier access to information and greater opportunities to impact decisions that shape their lives. A MOMENTUM white paper report by Charalabidis, Koussouris and Kipenis (2009) presented important data and results from these projects, offering preliminary policy suggestions for future application.

=== European e-participation initiatives ===
The European Commission has initiated several actions aimed at enhancing the support for e-participation.

These include:

- FP7 : ICT Challenge 7 : Objective ICT-2009.7.3 ICT for Governance and Policy Modelling. The Commission has issued calls in this area to fund research. Currently, the Integrated Program Future Policy Modelling (FUPOL) is the most extensive project in this field.
- The ICT Policy Support Programme (or ICT PSP) under the Competitiveness and Innovation Framework (CIP). The European project has announced a call in the CIP program on Theme 3: ICT for government and governance.

== See also ==
- Collaborative e-democracy
- Direct democracy
- E-democracy
- eGovernment
- Electronic civil disobedience
- eRulemaking
- Emergent democracy
- Hacktivism
- Internet activism
- Online consultation
- Online deliberation
- Online participation
- Online petition
- Open politics
- Open source governance
- Parliamentary informatics
- Participatory democracy
- Radical transparency
- Second Superpower
- Smart mob
- Spatial Citizenship
- Social translucence
- Virtual volunteering
