= Reputation =

Social opinion about an entity

The reputation or prestige (sometimes referred to as "reputational prestige") of a social entity (a person, a social group, an organization, or a place) is an opinion about that entity – typically developed as a result of social evaluation on a set of criteria, such as behavior or performance.

Reputation is a ubiquitous, spontaneous, and highly efficient mechanism of social control. It is a subject of study in social, management, and technological sciences. Its influence ranges from competitive settings, like markets, to cooperative ones, like firms, organizations, institutions and communities. Furthermore, reputation acts on different levels of agency: individual and supra-individual. At the supra-individual level, it concerns groups, communities, collectives and abstract social entities (such as firms, corporations, organizations, countries, cultures and even civilizations). It affects phenomena of different scales, from everyday life to relationships between nations. Reputation is a fundamental instrument of social order, based upon distributed, spontaneous social control.

The concept of reputation is considered important in business, politics, education, online communities, and many other fields, and it may be considered as a reflection of a social entity's identity.

== Corporate reputation ==
=== Reputation as a concept for companies ===
==== Academic literature ====
Since 1980, the study of "corporate reputation" has attracted growing scholarly attention from economics, sociology, and management. The concept of reputation has undergone substantial evolution in the academic literature over the past several decades. Terminology such as reputation, branding, image and identity is often used interchangeably in both the popular press and – until recently – in the academic literature, as well.

The academic literature has generally settled on a small cluster of perspectives on "what reputation is" in a company context.

Mark C. Suchman (1995) examines the relationship between legitimacy, status, and reputation, emphasizing that while these concepts are interconnected, they represent distinct forms of social evaluation. Legitimacy refers to the degree to which an organization's actions align with societal norms and values, status reflects its position within a social hierarchy, and reputation is based on assessments of its past actions and achievements. Understanding these distinctions is essential for organizations seeking to navigate their social environments successfully.

Economists use game-theory to describe corporate reputations as strategic signals that companies use to convey to markets some of their qualities and abilities. Sociologists view corporate reputation as descriptions of the relative status that companies occupy in an institutional field of rivals and stakeholders. Management scholars describe corporate reputations in one of two main ways, including:

- the broad view: as an aggregation of perceptions that form as audiences judge the behaviors of companies.
  - This is often evaluated by broad ranking measures of the company as a whole, such as the Fortune Most Admired Companies rankings
- the specific view: as an assessment, by some specific audience, of the company's ability to perform or behave in a certain way. These are split into two broad categories: (a) outcome/capability reputation and (b) behavior/character reputation, which is intended to capture both the economic and sociological forms of reputation.
  - (a) outcome/capability reputation: this reputation type involves an assessment of how well the company performs on a certain dimension. The most common examples of these is performing well financially or providing high quality products or services. All of these dimensions can be objectively ordered, such as better/worse financial performance (as evaluated by objective, market-based measures of financial performance) or better/worse product quality (as evaluated by a collection of users).
  - (b) behavior/character reputation: this reputation type is said to arise when a company is recognized as consistently behaving in a certain way, in a manner that is relatively devoid of objectively identifiable performance. For instance, a company might prioritize investment in innovation, the improvement of its operational efficiency, or sourcing from local suppliers.

==== Practical measurement of reputation ====
In practice, corporate reputations are revealed by the relative rankings of companies created and propagated by information intermediaries. For example, business magazines and newspapers such as Fortune, Forbes, Business Week, Financial Times, and The Wall Street Journal regularly publish lists of the best places to work, the best business schools, or the most innovative companies. These rankings are explicit orderings of corporate reputations, and the relative positions of companies on these rankings reflect their relative performance on various cognitive attributes. Corporate reputations are found to influence the attractiveness of ranked companies as suppliers of products, as prospective employers, and as investments. For those reasons, companies themselves have become increasingly involved with the practice of reputation management.

=== Connections to related, company-level concepts ===
Like any social construct, reputation is similar to (i.e., convergent with) certain concepts and different (i.e., discriminant) from others. Reputation can be compared to other "social evaluation" or "social judgment" constructs. For instance, reputation is said to be convergent with adjacent concepts like corporate image, identity, celebrity, status, legitimacy, social approval (likability), and visibility (prominence), but discriminant from related constructs like stigma and infamy. Reputation is often considered to be a pragmatic evaluation – actors determine whether the target of the evaluation can be seen as useful to them.

Until recently, the relationships with these adjacent constructs were merely theoretical; that is, they were not formally tested or empirically validated for their "nomological relationships" with these other, related constructs.

- Conceptual relationships: In 2012, the Oxford Handbook of Corporate Reputation was released to provide some clarity to the increasingly fragmented field of social evaluation constructs, all of which had been referred to (either implicitly or explicitly) under an umbrella of "reputation" concepts. In 2020, the introductory part of The Power of Being Divisive: Understanding Negative Evaluations, develops a framework to disentangle a variety of concepts in the field of social evaluations – in particular making the point that negative and positive evaluations can be on different continua, and social actors can be both positively and negatively evaluated at the same time. In this opus and in the Oxford handbook, scholars made incremental efforts to distinguish between handfuls of these constructs, such as:
  - reputation vs. celebrity
  - reputation vs. status
  - reputation vs. legitimacy vs. status
  - reputation vs. social approval
  - reputation vs. stigma
  - reputation vs. status vs. celebrity vs. stigma
- Empirical relationships: In 2020, Bitektine and colleagues conducted the first major construct validation study to: (a) create scales for the constructs of reputation, cognitive legitimacy, sociopolitical legitimacy, and status, and (b) empirically distinguish between them by undertaking a multiple studies involving several confirmatory factor analyses.
  - This construct validation effort addressed the "broad view" of reputation as a company-level evaluation (not an evaluation for specific attributes). The scale items for reputation that resulted from this effort, as evaluated by an audience of respondents representing the general public, included: "The reputation of this company is excellent", "[this] is a reputable company", and "[this] is a dependable company".
  - There still exists no construct validation effort for the "specific view" of reputation (i.e., that reputation is best understood as a specific audience's view of the company with respect to a specific attribute).

=== Consequences ===
==== Performance outcomes ====
Myriad reputation studies from the 1980s to the 2000s demonstrated that a company's reputation was positively related to various performance measures, such as financial success and profitability. However, more recent work demonstrated that reputation can be both "a benefit and a burden", suggesting that "the bigger you are, the harder you (might) fall" with respect to reputation.

==== Decision outcomes ====
Relatedly, researchers have theorized or demonstrated that a company's reputation could also influence the decisions and perceptions of its managers; in some cases, reputation can promote the use of risk-reduction strategies by managers as they seek to preserve the reputation they have cultivated. In other cases, researchers argue that reputation can embolden managers to take risks in areas unrelated to their reputation, since stakeholders may be focused on the reputation itself and inattentive to other areas of the company.

== Topics relating to reputation ==
=== Reputation management ===
Many organizations create public relations and corporate communication departments dedicated to assisting companies with reputation management. In addition, many public relations and consulting firms claim expertise in reputation management. The growth of the public relations industry has largely been due to the rising demand for companies to establish credibility and reputation. Incidents which damage a company's reputation for honesty or safety may cause serious damage to finances. For example, in 1999 Coca-Cola lost $60 million (by its own estimate) after schoolchildren reported suffering from symptoms like headaches, nausea and shivering after drinking its products.

Although most companies see reputation management as a central part of a CEO's role, managing reputation involves a set of ongoing activities that are best managed when they are delegated to a specific individual in the organization. This is why some companies have created the position of chief reputation officer (CRO). A growing number of people in the business world now have the word "reputation" in their titles – including Dow Chemical, SABMiller, Coca-Cola, Allstate, Repsol YPF, Weber Shandwick, and GlaxoSmithKline (although no longer). Hoover's shows a list of such officers.

Social media like Twitter, Linked In, and Facebook have made it increasingly important for companies to monitor their online reputations in order to anticipate and respond to criticisms of their actions. There are two main routes that customers can take when complaining about companies: individual-direct response or broadcast-based response. For a company, it takes a lot of time and effort to address individual-direct responses. One study showed that "...72% of customers expect a reply within one hour." In order to best recover from negative complaints on social media, it is important for a company to prove its authenticity by providing more specific answers directly to its critics.

=== Reputation capital ===
A corporate reputation can be managed, accumulated and traded in for trust, legitimization of a position of power and social recognition, and people are prepared to pay a premium price for goods and services offered, which in turn generates higher customer loyalty, a stronger willingness from shareholders to hold on to shares in times of crisis, and greater likelihood to invest in the company's stock. Therefore, reputation is one of the most valuable forms of "capital" of a company. "Delivering functional and social expectations of the public on the one hand and manage to build a unique identity on the other hand creates trust and this trust builds the informal framework of a company. This framework provides "return in cooperation" and produces reputation capital. A positive reputation will secure a company or organisation long-term competitive advantages. The higher a company's reputation capital, the lower the costs of supervising and exercising control."

=== Building reputation through stakeholder management ===
According to stakeholder theory, corporations should be managed for the benefit of all their "stakeholders," not just their shareholders. Stakeholders of a company include any individual or group that can influence or is influenced by a company's practices. The stakeholders of a company can be suppliers, consumers, employees, shareholders, financial community, government, and media. Companies must properly manage the relationships between stakeholder groups and they must consider the interest(s) of each stakeholder group carefully. Therefore, it becomes essential to integrate public relations into corporate governance to manage the relationships between these stakeholders which will enhance the organization's reputation. Corporations or institutions which behave ethically and govern in a good manner build reputational capital which is a competitive advantage. A good reputation enhances profitability because it attracts customers to products, investors to securities and employees to its jobs. A company's reputation is an intangible asset and a source of competitive advantage against rivals because the company will be viewed as more reliable, credible, trustworthy and responsible to its employees, customers, shareholders and financial markets.

In addition, according to MORI's survey of about 200 managers in the private sector, 99% responded that the management of corporate reputation is very (83%) or fairly (16%) important. Reputation is a reflection of companies' culture and identity. Also, it is the outcome of managers' efforts to prove their success and excellence. It is sustained through acting reliably, credibly, trustworthily and responsibly in the market. It can be sustained through consistent communication activities both internally and externally with key stakeholder groups. This directly influences a public company's stock prices in the financial market. Therefore, this reputation makes a reputational capital that becomes a strategic asset and advantage for that company. As a consequence, public relations must be used in order to establish long lasting relationships with the stakeholders, which will enhance the reputation of the company.

=== Causes and consequences ===
Reputation models can be placed in a broader framework that distinguishes reputation from its underlying causes and from its consequences. This approach is important to clarify the meaning of reputation.

- Causes of reputation are seen to reside in stakeholder experiences. Stakeholder experiences relate to a company's day-to-day business operations, its branding and marketing and "noise" in the system, such as the media and word of mouth. Further causes of reputation may include the perceived innovativeness of a company, the customers' expectations, the (perceived) quality of the company's goods and services and the subsequent customer satisfaction, all of which differ according to the respective customers' cultural background.
- The consequences of reputation reside in the behaviors (supportive or resistant) that stakeholders demonstrate towards a company. Behaviors such as advocacy, commitment, and cooperation are key positive outcomes of a good reputation. Boycotts and lawsuits are key negative outcomes of a bad reputation.

=== Reputation recovery/repair ===
Organizations frequently make missteps that cause them to lose the positive regard of stakeholders. In the wake of studies addressing the disproportionate penalties that accrue to high reputation firms when they make such missteps, reputation researchers have proposed models to account for both reputation damage and reputation repair, summarizing prior work in disciplines including economics, marketing, accounting, and management.

=== Reputation transfer ===
In the context of brand extension strategies, many companies rely on reputation transfer as a means of transferring the good reputation of a company and its existing products to new markets and new products. Consumers who are already familiar with other products of an established brand, exhibiting customer satisfaction and loyalty, will more easily accept new products of the same brand. In contrast to brand extension, the general concept of reputation transfer also requires the transfer of a company's values and identity to the new products and/or services and the related brands when entering new markets. It is important, however, to pay attention to the image fit between preexisting and new brands, for this factor has been proven to be critical for the success of brand extensions. In contrast to the special case of brand extension, the general concept of reputation transfer also requires the transfer of the values and identity of a company to the new products and/or services and the related brands when entering new markets. A strong image might therefore even hamper the introduction of new product lines if customers do not associate the competences relevant to the new market/category/product line with the existing company or brand. A company's reputation is furthermore influenced by culture, as nationalities differ with regard to how valued specific aspects of the company's brand identity are in the respective national culture (e.g. environmental concerns or work ethics) as well as with regard to popular cultural dimensions (e.g. Hofstede). Subsequently, these differences impact the success of reputation transfer significantly.

== Cognitive view of reputation ==
The cognitive view of reputation has become increasingly prominent in reputation research. It has led to improved understanding of the role played by reputation in a number of practical domains and scientific fields. In the study of cooperation and social dilemmas, for instance, the role of reputation as a partner selection mechanism started to be appreciated in the early 1980s.

Working toward such a definition, reputation can be viewed as a socially transmitted meta-belief (i.e., belief about belief) that is a property of an agent, that results from the attitudes other actors have about some socially desirable behaviour, be it cooperation, reciprocity, or norm-compliance. Reputation plays a crucial role in the evolution of these behaviours: reputation transmission allows socially desirable behaviour to spread. Rather than concentrating on the property only, the cognitive model of reputation accounts not only for reputation-formation but also for the propagation of reputation.

To model this aspect, it is necessary to specify and develop a more refined classification of reputation. In informal settings, gossip, although vague, may contain precious hints both to facts ("I've been told this physician has shown questionable behavior") and to conflicts taking place at the information level (if a candidate for a role spreads defamatory information about another candidate, whom should you trust?).

Moreover, the expression "it is said that John Smith is a cheater" is intrinsically a reputation spreading act, because on one hand it refers to a (possibly false) common opinion, and on the other the very act of saying "it is said" is self-assessing, since it provides at least one factual occasion when that something is said, because the person who says so (the gossiper), while appearing to spread the saying a bit further, may actually be in the phase of initiating it.

Gossip can also be used as an identifier only – as when gossiping about unreachable icons, like royalty or showbiz celebrities – useful only to show the gossiper belongs to the group of the informed ones. While most cases seem to share the characteristic of being primarily used to predict future behavior, they can have, for example, manipulative sub-goals, even more important than the forecast.

In the case of a communication between two parties, one (the advisee) that is requesting advice about the potential for danger in a financial transaction with another party (the potential partner, target), and the other (the adviser, evaluator) that is giving advice. Roughly speaking, the advice could fall under one of the following three categories :

1. the adviser declares it believes the potential partner is (is not) good for the transaction in object;
2. the adviser declares it believes another (named or otherwise defined) agent or set of agents believes the potential partner is (is not) good for the transaction in object;
3. the adviser declares it believes in an undefined set of agents, hence there is a belief the potential partner is (is not) good for the transaction in object.

Note the care to maintain the possible levels of truth (the adviser declares – but could be lying – it believes – but could be wrong – etc..). The cases are listed, as it is evident, in decreasing order of responsibility. While one could feel most actual examples fall under the first case, the other two are not unnecessarily complicated nor actually infrequent. Indeed, most of the common gossip falls under the third category, and, except for electronic interaction, this is the most frequent form of referral. All examples concern the evaluation of a given object (target), a social agent (which may be either individual or supra-individual, and in the latter case, either a group or a collective), held by another social agent, the evaluator.

The examples above can be turned into more precise definitions using the concept of social evaluation. At this point, we can propose to coin a new lexical item, image, whose character should be immediately evident and is clearly linked to reputation.

=== Image ===
Image is a global or averaged evaluation of a given target on the part of an agent. It consists of (a set of) social evaluations about the characteristics of the target. Image as an object of communication is what is exchanged in examples 1 and 2, above. In the second case, we call it third-party image. It may concern a subset of the target's characteristics, i.e., its willingness to comply with socially accepted norms and customs, or its skills (ways), or its definition as pertaining to a precise agent. Indeed, we can define special cases of image, including third-party image, the evaluation that an agent believes a third party has of the target, or even shared image, that is, an evaluation shared by a group. Not even this last is reputation, since it tries to define too precisely the mental status of the group.

Reputation, as distinct from image, is the process and the effect of transmitting a target image. We call reputation transmission a communication of an evaluation without the specification of the evaluator, if not for a group attribution, and only in the default sense discussed before. This covers the case of example 3 above. More precisely, reputation is a believed, social, meta-evaluation; it is built upon three distinct but interrelated objects :

1. a cognitive representation, or more precisely a believed evaluation – this could be somebody's image, but is enough that this consist of a communicated evaluation;
2. a population object, i.e., a propagating believed evaluation; and
3. an objective emergent property at the agent level, i.e., what the agent is believed to be.

In fact, reputation is a highly dynamic phenomenon in two distinct senses: it is subject to change, especially as an effect of corruption, errors, deception, etc.; and it emerges as an effect of a multi-level bidirectional process. Reputation is also how others know and perceive you as an individual.

While image only moves (when transmitted and accepted) from one individual cognition to another, the anonymous character of reputation makes it a more complex phenomenon. Reputation proceeds from the level of individual cognition (when is born, possibly as an image, but not always) to the level of social propagation (at this level, it not necessarily believed as from any specific agent) and from this level back to individual cognition again (when it is accepted).

Moreover, once it gets to the population level, reputation gives rise to a further property at the agent level. It is both what people think about targets and what targets are in the eyes of others. From the very moment an agent is targeted by the community, his or her life will change whether he or she wants it or not or believes it or not. Reputation has become the immaterial, more powerful equivalent of a scarlet letter sewed to one's clothes. It is more powerful because it may not even be perceived by the individual to whom it sticks, and consequently it is out of the individual's power to control and manipulate.

reputation is the sum of impressions held by a company's stakeholders. In other words, reputation is in the "eyes of the beholder". It need not be just a company's reputation but could be the reputation of an individual, country, brand, political party, industry. But the key point in reputation is not what the leadership insists but what others perceive it to be. For a company, its reputation is how esteemed it is in the eyes of its employees, customers, investors, talent, prospective candidates, competitors, analysts, alumni, regulators and the list goes on.

== Reputation in social learning ==
Research also shows that reputation plays a cognitively demanding role in social learning, especially because complex reputation systems depend on a large working memory that enables perspective-taking and the attribution of intentions, capacities that allow individuals to follow shared norms, build and evaluate the reputations of others and ultimately identify reliable models from whom to learn.

Reputation plays a fundamental role in structuring human social life, extending beyond its function as a marker of past behaviour to serve as a mechanism that actively shapes how individuals learn and cooperate within groups. In fact, it has been described as a currency valid across multiple social contexts simultaneously, so that, in experimental settings, participants who maintain a good reputation throughout one social game are more likely to receive cooperation in others.

Humans are distinguished from other species by their extensive reliance on social learning, which enables the cumulative transmission of knowledge and skills across generations. Unlike individual trial-and-error learning, social learning allows us to acquire adaptive information directly from others. This happens through a process that Henrich and Gil-White (2001) call "infocopying", a distinctly human form of learning by directly imitating others actions and understanding their goals. However, research does show that cumulative learning is not always reliant on a single mechanism, so direct imitation or just teaching are each independently sufficient to produce effective cumulative cultural learning.

=== Prestige bias and Success bias ===
A key mechanism through which reputation shapes social learning is prestige-biased transmission. Whilst reputations refers broadly to the collective evaluation of an individual based on their past actions and perceived qualities, prestige is a specific form of reputation and is seen as the freely conferred deference given to individuals perceived as particularly skilled or knowledgeable in a valued domain. As separate pathways to attaining social influence it is also important to distinguish reputation from dominance. Whilst dominance is attained through coercion or threat, prestige is earned by demonstrating competence and is associated with voluntary deference from group members. In fact, empirical research conducted in naturally occurring community groups, including sports clubs, volunteer organisations, and businesses, found that individuals identified as desirable learning models were rated as highly prestigious but not highly dominant, showing separation of measures.

Evolutionary and psychological perspectives both help explain why reputation, in the form of prestige bias, shapes social learning. At the proximate level, meaning how the behaviour operates, individuals develop a tendency to defer to and rank others by perceived skill because it is a cognitive shortcut, such that, prestige cues automatically draw their attention to high-status models and trigger feelings like admiration, helping them identify who to learn from without gathering all the information themselves. Whilst at the ultimate level, meaning why the behaviour even exists, prestige bias is thought to have evolved because copying skilled individuals enhanced survival and reproductive fitness, increasing an individual's mate selection opportunities and overall chances of passing on their genes. Therefore, how much deference a person receives from others is an efficient signal of how good a model they are to potential learners.

Even though the specific domains through which prestige is conferred vary across cultures, an ethnography of the Semai, an indigenous Malaysian people, illustrates an interesting dynamic. Among the community, respected elders have influence not through authority or force, but through the voluntary deference of people who choose to "hear" them because of their perceived wisdom. If community members then do not follow their advice, there are no social repercussions. However, elders who behave as though entitled to this deference, and get confrontational if they are not "heard", risk losing their reputation entirely. This highlights how reputation is dependent not only on the continued judgement of others but also on individual projections of humility.

However, the most direct way to identify a good learning model would be to assess their competence first-hand, a strategy known as success bias, where individuals preferentially copy the most successful demonstrator. But, directly inferring success is often difficult or costly, particularly in complex domains where variation in outcomes does not depend exclusively on skill. Therefore, reputation evolved as an adaptive shortcut, so that individuals could assess a model's competence by the amount of deference, attention, and copying others direct towards it, overall underpinning our ecological success.

In practice, prestige bias and success bias often operate alongside one another, with learners drawing on both strategies depending on the availability and reliability of information. In fact, both can be seen to emerge in early human development within experimental frameworks. For example, Canadian children were found to be more likely to copy the preferences of an adult demonstrator to whom bystanders had been preferentially attending, rather than a demonstrator who had been ignored.

=== Credibility and gossip in reputation systems ===
Lastly, for reputation to function effectively as a guide for social learning, the information it conveys must be credible, because without credibility, deference could be misplaced and learners risk copying poor models, transmitting cultural knowledge that is inefficient in maintaining our ecological success. Reputation tends to be honest because the deference people show towards others is costly to fake, as an individual cannot convincingly defer to someone they would not actually copy without risking being labelled as insincere. Therefore, reputation, can be seen as a relatively reliable indicator of model quality to others. Further promoting honest behaviour is the threat of reputational information, like certain actions, being observed and then communicated to others within the wider group via gossip, making reputation systems partially self-regulating. However, the reliability of reputational information is not always guaranteed. This spurs individuals to actively cross-check it by consulting multiple sources, though conflicting reports sometimes reduce rather than improve confidence in assessments. Individuals can be seen to preferentially weight information received from trusted contacts, and the reputation of gossip sources is itself eroded when they fail to provide reliable information.

Honesty in communication therefore becomes a valued reputational dimension in itself.

Overall, the mechanisms of prestige-bias and success bias together suggest that reputation is not merely a byproduct of social life but a fundamental driver of how humans selectively learn from one another, underpinning the cumulative cultural transmission that distinguishes our species.

== Online ==
Online reputation plays a crucial role in online communities where trust is a key factor. Platforms such as eBay implement customer feedback systems to publicly rate users, while Amazon.com employs a similar review system to assess seller credibility. Additionally, establishing and maintaining a strong reputation serves as a significant motivator for individuals to actively engage in online communities.

Individuals employ monitoring to ensure that they keep up with their online reputation. Given the number of sites on the Internet, it is impossible to manually monitor the entire web for pages that may affect one's online reputation. Free tools such as Google Alerts can be used to keep track of online reputations on a small scale, while larger businesses and clients may use more powerful analytics to monitor online interactions and mentions.

Paid tools for online reputation management focus on either brand protection or online reputation. These tools track mentions of a brand or product on the Internet, on Facebook, Twitter, blogs, and other social networking sites and websites.

Online reputation is determined by how effectively it is managed. The term digital reputation (or web reputation) is used to emphasize its broader scope, as it extends beyond online interactions to influence an individual's or company's overall public perception. It is important to distinguish online reputation from a company's digital identity, which refers specifically to its online presence and branding. Indeed, digital or web reputation does not concern the virtual online reputation only, but the whole real reputation of a person or a company as it is affected by the Internet. Online reputation, furthermore, should not be confused with a company's digital identity.

An online reputation is the perception that one generates on the Internet based on their digital footprint. Digital footprints accumulate through all of the content shared, feedback provided, and information that is created online. Due to the fact that if someone has a bad online reputation, they can easily change their pseudonym, new accounts on sites such as eBay or Amazon are usually distrusted. If an individual or company wants to manage their online reputation, they will face many more difficulties.

According to one study, 84% of responding business leaders saw the greatest reputation threat online to companies as negative media coverage. The next two greatest threats are customer complaints in the media or on grievance sites online (71%) and negative word of mouth (54%). This negative word of mouth could come not only from dissatisfied customers but from employees as well. With the power of business review websites and customer forums, a company's online reputation can be damaged anonymously.

Employers have begun using the online reputations of job applicants to guide their hiring choices. By checking a candidate's social networking profiles on sites such as Facebook, Twitter, and MySpace, employers gain insight into a candidate's character and suitability for a job.

Some individuals and organizations hire reputation management companies to attempt to hide truthful but unflattering information about themselves. A recent alleged example is that of Dr. Anil Potti, who resigned from Duke University after it was discovered that he had misrepresented himself on his resume and became the subject of a scientific misconduct investigation.

== See also ==
- Digital identity
- Face (sociological concept)
- Governance
- Honour
- Id, ego and superego
- Reputation management
- Signaling game § Reputation game
- Social capital
- Social map
- Social software
- Virtual community
