= Battle Bears Gold =

2013 video game

- Developer: SkyVu
- Publisher: SkyVu
- Platforms: iOS; Android; Windows Store
- Release: iOS; WW: May 24, 2013 (servers inaccessible as of 2025); Android; WW: June 3, 2013 (servers inaccessible as of 2025)
- Genre: Third-person shooter
- Mode: Single-player

Battle Bears Gold was a third-person shooter multiplayer video game developed by SkyVu, a company based in Omaha, Nebraska. It was first released on May 24, 2013 on the App Store and Google Play. The game was later released for Android on June 3, 2013 and Windows through the Windows Store later that year. It features 11 different 'classes' battling in 5 different game modes. In a FAQ for their new game Battle Bears Heroes, SkyVu stated that Battle Bears Gold was discontinued because of outdated code and deprecated server technologies, and noted that a remastered version of the game is planned for the studio’s development roadmap.

== Gameplay ==
Battle Bears Gold was a first-person shooter game featuring cartoon-styled bears in various roles across 11 different classes, battling on various game maps. The eleven playable characters were Oliver (Soldier), B-1000 (Assault), Riggs (Heavy), Wil (Chub Scout), Huggable (Huggable), Astoria (Sniper), Graham (Engineer), Tillman (Demolition), Botch (Assassin), Saberi (Combat Tech), and Sanchez (Arbiter). Players competed in different game modes, each with its own objectives. The game received multiple accolades from the "Best App Ever" awards and was reviewed and covered by outlets such as Slide To Play. At its peak, it served as SkyVu's flagship title and was supported through in-app purchases, including “joules,” which could also be earned through gameplay, and “gas cans,” which could be either purchased or obtained trough in-game login. The game featured a ranking system that advanced with each match.

=== Game Modes ===
- Team Deathmatch: Up to eight players are split into two teams and fight for four minutes. If both teams have the same number of kills, the team that dealt the most damage wins.
- Free-For-All: An ally-less battle with a 4-minute time limit.
- Plant The Bomb: Each team must cooperate and work together in order to carry a bomb from the center of the map to a disposal hatch located near or in the enemy base. 5-minute time limit. The team that planted the most bombs wins. In the event of a tie, the team with the most kills or damage wins.
- Brick Battle: The players must do battle with bricks.
- Tutorial: Shows you how to play the game which includes how to: shoot, move, swap weapons, use specials, and other commands.

=== Ex Game Modes ===
- King of the Windmill: Two teams of four fight over bases known as "windmills" to earn points within four and a half minutes. The team that has captured the most windmills at the end of the time limit wins.

=== Supported Platforms ===
The game was available for free on Windows, Android, Google Play, and iOS App Stores. Battle Bears Gold supported in-app purchases through the Google Play Store, Windows 8 Store, and the Apple iTunes/App Store. However, the game’s servers were permanently shut down as of 2025, making it no longer available to play.

=== Maps ===
The maps were set in a wide variety of locales, including No Bears' Land (a warzone), Skate or Die (a skate park), and Abusement Park (a carnival). Each map had distinct features that affected gameplay, ranging from overhangs that influenced the use of aerial weapons to semi-transparent walls that blocked player movement; some maps were even interactive.

== Reputation System ==
After a match, players had a "thumbs up/down" rating system. They could give ratings based on the actions of other players during gameplay. The reputation system was used to mark offending players and temporarily restrict them, while also rewarding positive behavior with free in-game currency.

== Development ==
The app was developed by SkyVu Entertainment, an Omaha-based company, and released as a successor to Battle Bears Royale.

== Reception ==
Gamewoof said of Battle Bears Gold, "Every now and again something that seems like a waste of time when starting out, surprises you and ends up being something worthwhile. Battle Bears Gold is one of these games."

Lonniedos said of Battle Bears Gold, "What does freakin'... that bear has a gun. I don't know if we're not giving this enough attention. im going to think that its probably the case because there's no too much attention for that, that bear has a gun, lets play."

Dan Avery of Queerty writes about Battle Bears, "Battle Bears, a hit release from SkyVu Entertainment, sees militaristic ursine soldiers blasting warm-and-fuzzy pink bears called Huggables. When the cuddly critters are shot, though, they bleed rainbows instead of blood and guts."
