= Suchman =

Suchman is a surname. Notable people with the surname include:

- Lucy Suchman (fl. 1972), British sociologist
- Mark C. Suchman (born 1960), American sociologist
