= Online participation =

Extent to which the web encourages the people to share in organizational decision-making

Online participation is used to describe the interaction between users and online communities on the web. Online communities often involve members to provide content to the website or contribute in some way. Examples of such include wikis, blogs, online multiplayer games, and other types of social platforms. Online participation is currently a heavily researched field. It provides insight into fields such as web design, online marketing, crowdsourcing, and many areas of psychology. Some subcategories that fall under online participation are: commitment to online communities, coordination and interaction, and member recruitment.

== Knowledge sharing infrastructures ==
Some key examples of online knowledge sharing infrastructures include the following:

- Wikipedia: An online, publicly editable encyclopedia with hundreds of thousands of editors
- Slashdot: A popular technology-related forum, with articles and comments from readers. Slashdot subculture has become well known in Internet circles. Users accumulate a "karma score" and volunteer moderators are selected from those with high scores.
- Usenet: Established in 1980 as a "distributed Internet discussion system", it became the first medium for Internet communities. Volunteer moderators and votetakers contribute to the community.
- Etc. (the Web 2.0 is also referred to as the "writable web" for indicating that many people participate to the creation of its content)

In the past important online knowledge sharing infrastructures included:

- AOL: The largest of the online service providers, with chat rooms which for years were voluntarily moderated by community leaders. Rooms and most message boards are no longer moderated, however.
- The WELL: A pioneering online community established in 1985. The WELL's culture has been the subject of several books and articles. Many users voluntarily contribute to community building and maintenance (e.g., as conference hosts).

== Motivations ==
Many online communities (e.g. Blogs, Chat rooms, Electronic mailing lists, Internet forums, Imageboards, Wikis), are not only knowledge-sharing resources but also fads. Studies have shown that committed members of online communities have reasons to remain active. As long as members feel the need to contribute, there is a mutual dependence between the community and the member.

Although many researchers have come up with several motivational factors behind online contribution, these theories can all be categorized under intrinsic and extrinsic motivations. Intrinsic motivation refers to an action that is driven by personal interests and internal emotions in the task itself while extrinsic motivation refers to an action that is influenced by external factors, often for a certain outcome, reward or recognition. The two types of motivation contradict each other but often go hand-in-hand in cases where continual contribution is observed.

Several motivational factors lead people to continue their participation to these online communities and remain loyal. Peter Kollock researched motivations for contributing to online communities. Kollock (1999, p. 227) outlines three motivations that do not rely on altruistic behavior on the part of the contributor: anticipated reciprocity; increased recognition; and sense of efficacy. Another motivation, in which Marc Smith mentions in his 1992 thesis Voices from the WELL: The Logic of the Virtual Commons is "Communion"—a "sense of community" as it is referred to in social psychology. In a simple sentence we can say it is made by people for the people.

=== Anticipated reciprocity ===
A person is motivated to contribute valuable information to the group in the expectation that one will receive useful help and information in return. Indeed, there is evidence that active participants in online communities get more responses faster to questions than unknown participants. The higher the expectation of reciprocity, the greater the chance of there being high knowledge contribution intent in an online community. Reciprocity represents a sense of fairness where individuals usually reciprocate the positive feedback they receive from others so that they can in return get more useful knowledge from others in the future.

Research has shown that self esteem needs of recognition from others lead to expectations of reciprocity. Self-esteem plays such an important role in the need for reciprocity because contributing to online communities can be an ego booster for many types of users. The more positive feedback contributors get from other members of their community, the closer they may feel to being considered an expert in the knowledge they are sharing. Because of this, contributing to online communities can lead to a sense of self-value and respect, based on the level of positive feedback reciprocated from the community In addition, there is evidence that active participants in online communities get more responses faster to questions than unknown participants.

A study on the participation in eBay's reputation system demonstrated that the expectation of reciprocal behavior from partners increases participation from self-interested eBay buyers and sellers. Standard economic theory predicts that people are not inclined to contribute voluntarily to the provision of such public goods but, rather, they tend to free ride on the contributions of others. Nevertheless, empirical results from eBay show that buyers submit ratings to more than 50% of transactions. The main takeaways from their conclusion were that they found that experienced users tend to rate more frequently, and motivation for leaving comments is not strongly motivated by pure altruism targeted towards the specific transaction partner, but from self-interest and reciprocity to "warm glow" feeling of contribution.

Some theories support altruism as being a key motivator in online participation and reciprocity. Although evidence from sociology, economics, political science, and social psychology shows that altruism is part of human nature, recent research reveals that the pure altruism model lacks predictive power in many situations. Several authors have proposed combining a "joy-of-giving" (sometimes also referred to as "warm glow") motive with altruism to create a model of impure altruism. Different from altruism, reciprocity represents a pattern of behavior where people respond to friendly or hostile actions with similar actions even if no material gains are expected.

Voluntary participation in online feedback mechanisms seems to be largely motivated by self-interest. Because their reputation is on the line, the eBay study showed that some partners using eBay's feedback mechanism had selfish motivations to rate others. For example, data showed that some eBay users exhibited reciprocity towards partners who rated them first. This caused them to only rate partners with hopes the increase the probability of eliciting a reciprocal response.

=== Recognition ===
Recognition is important to online contributors such that, in general, individuals want recognition for their contributions. Some have called this Egoboo. Kollock outlines the importance of reputation online: "Rheingold (1993) in his discussion of the WELL (an early online community) lists the desire for prestige as one of the key motivations of individuals' contributions to the group. To the extent this is the concern of an individual, contributions will likely be increased to the degree that the contribution is visible to the community as a whole and to the extent there is some recognition of the person's contributions. ... the powerful effects of seemingly trivial markers of recognition (e.g. being designated as an 'official helper') has been commented on in a number of online communities..."

One of the key ingredients of encouraging a reputation is to allow contributors to be known or not to be anonymous. The following example, from Meyers (1989) study of the computer underground illustrates the power of reputation. When involved in illegal activities, computer hackers must protect their personal identities with pseudonyms. If hackers use the same nicknames repeatedly, this can help the authorities to trace them. Nevertheless, hackers are reluctant to change their pseudonyms regularly because the status and fame associated with a particular nickname would be lost.

On the importance of online identity: Profiles and reputation are clearly evident in online communities today. Amazon.com is a case in point, as all contributors are allowed to create profiles about themselves and as their contributions are measured by the community, their reputation increases. Myspace.com encourages elaborate profiles for members where they can share all kinds of information about themselves including what music they like, their heroes, etc. Displaying photos and information about individual members and their recent activities on social networking websites can promote bonds-based commitment. Because social interaction is the primary basis for building and maintaining social bonds, we can gain appreciation for other users once we interact with them. This appreciation turns into increased recognition for the contributors, which would in turn give them the incentive to contribute more.

In addition to this, many communities give incentives for contributing. For example, many forums award Members points for posting. Members can spend these points in a virtual store. eBay is an example of an online marketplace where reputation is very important because it is used to measure the trustworthiness of someone you potentially will do business with. This type of community is known as a reputation system, which is a type of collaborative filtering algorithm which attempts to collect, distribute, and aggregate ratings about all users' past behavior within an online community in an effort to strike a balance between the democratic principles of open publishing and maintaining standards of quality. These systems, like eBay's, promote the idea of trust that relates to expectations of reciprocity which can help increase the sense of reputation for each member. With eBay, you have the opportunity to rate your experience with someone and they, likewise, can rate you. This has an effect on the reputation score. The participants may therefore be encouraged to manage their online identity in order to make a good impression on the other members of the community.

Other successful online communities have reputation systems that do not exactly provide any concrete incentive. For example, Reddit is an online social content-aggregation community which serves as a "front page of the Internet" and allows its users to submit content (e.g. text, photos, links, news-articles, blog-posts, music or videos) under sometimes ambiguous usernames. It features a reputation system by which users can rate the quality of submissions and comments. The total votecount of a users' submissions are not of any practical value—however when users feel that their content is generally appreciated by the rest of the Reddit-community (or its sub-communities called "subreddits") they may be motivated to contribute more.

=== Sense of efficacy ===
Individuals may contribute valuable information because the act results in a sense of efficacy, that is, a sense that they are capable of achieving their desired outcome and have some effect on this environment. There is well-developed research literature that has shown how important a person's sense of efficacy is (e.g. Bandura 1995). Studies have shown that increasing the user's sense of efficacy boosts their intrinsic motivation and therefore makes them more likely to stay in an online community. According to Wang and Fesenmaier's research, efficacy is the biggest factor in affecting active contribution online. Of the many sub-factors, it was discovered that "satisfying other members' needs" is the biggest reason behind the increase of efficacy in a member followed by "being helpful to others" (Wang and Fesenmaier). Features such as the task progress bars and an attempt to reduce some difficulty of completing a general task can easily enhance the feeling of self-worth in the community. "Creating immersive experiences with clear goals, feedback and challenge that exercise peoples' skills to the limits but still leave them in control causes the experiences to be intrinsically interesting. Positive but constructive and sincere feedbacks also produce similar effects and increase motivation to complete more tasks. A competitive setting—which may or may not have been intended to be competitive can also increase a person's self-esteem if quality performance is assumed" (Kraut 2012)).

=== Sense of community ===
People, in general, are social beings and are motivated by receiving direct responses to their contributions. Most online communities enable this by allowing people to reply back to others' contributions (e.g. many Blogs allow comments from readers, one can reply back to forum posts, etc.). Granted, there is some overlap between improving one's reputation and gaining a sense of community, and it seems safe to say that there are also some overlapping areas between all four motivators.

While some people are active contributors to online discussion, others join virtual communities and do not actively participate, a concept referred to as lurking (Preece 2009). There are several reasons why people choose not to participate online. For instance, users may get the information they wanted without actively participating, think they are helpful by not posting, want to learn more about the community before becoming an active member, be unable to use the software provided, or dislike the dynamics they observe within the group (Preece, Nonnecke & Andrews 2004). When online communities have lurking members, the amount of participation within the group decreases and the sense of community for these lurking members also diminishes. Online participation increases the sense of community for all members, as well as gives them a motivation to continue participating.

Other problems regarding a sense of community arise when the online community attempts to attract and retain newcomers. These problems include difficulty of recruiting newcomers, making them stay committed early on, and controlling their possible inappropriate behavior. If an online community is able to solve these problems with their newcomers, then they can increase the sense of community within the entire group. A sense of community is also heightened in online communities when each person has a willingness to participate due to intrinsic and extrinsic motivations. Findings also show that newcomers may be unaware that an online social networking website even has a community. As these users build their own profiles and get used to the culture of the group over time, they eventually self-identify with the community and develop a sense of belonging to the community.

=== Self-expression ===
Another motivation for participance may also come from self-expression by what is being shared in or created for online communities.

=== Self-discovery ===
Self-discovery may be another motivation as many online-communities allow for feedback on personal beliefs, artistic creations, ideas and the like which may provide grounds to develop new perspectives on the self.

=== Personal influence ===
Depending on the online-platform content being shared on them can be perceived by millions around the world which gives participants a certain influence which can serve as a motivation for participation. Additionally high participation may provide a user with special rights within a community (such as modship) which can be inbuilt into the technical platform, be granted by the community (e.g. via voting) or certain users.

=== Purposive value ===
Online-participation may be motivated by an instrumental purpose such as providing specific information.

=== Enjoyment ===
The entertainment of playing or otherwise interacting with other users may be a major motivation for participants in certain communities.

=== Motivations towards Facebook use ===
Users of social networks have various reasons that motivate them to join particular networks. In general "communication technologies open up new pathways between individuals who would not otherwise connect". The ability to have synchronous communication arrived with the development of online social networks. Facebook is one example of an online social network that people choose to openly participate in. Although there are a number of different social networking platforms available, there exists a large community of people who choose to actively engage on Facebook. Although Facebook is commonly known as a method of communication, there are a variety of reasons why users prefer to use Facebook, over other platforms, as their social networking platform. For some users, interactivity between themselves and other user is a matter of fidelity.

==== Facebook as a community ====
For many, it is important to maintain a sense of community. Through participation on online social networks it becomes easier for users to find and communicate with people within their community. Facebook often has friend recommendations based on the geography of the user. This allows users to quickly connect with people in their area whom they may not see often, and stay in contact with them. For students, Facebook is an effective network to participate in when building and maintaining social capital. By adding family, friends, acquaintances, and colleagues who use the network, students can expand their social capital. The online connections they make can later prove to be of benefit later on. Due to the competitive nature of the job market "[i]t is particularly important for university students to build social capital with the industry". Since Facebook has a large number of active users it is easier for students to find out about opportunities relating to jobs through their friends online.

==== Features ====
Facebook's interface allows users to share content, such as status updates, photos, links, and keep in contact with people they may not be able to see on a day-to-day basis. The messenger application allows friends to have conversations privately from their other friends. Users can also create groups and events through Facebook in order to share information with specific people on the network. "Facebook encourages users to engage in self-promoting". Facebook allows users to engage in self-promotion in a positive way; it allows friends to like and/or comment on posts and statuses. Facebook users are also able to "follow" people whom they may not be friends with, such as public figures, companies, or celebrities. This allows users to keep up to date with things that interest them like music, sports, and promotions from their favorite companies, and share them with their Facebook friends.

==== Individualized experience ====
Aside from features such as email, the photo album, and status updates, Facebook provides various additional features which help to individualize each users experience. Some social networks have a specific interface that users cannot individualize to their specific interests, Facebook allows users to control certain preferences. Users can use "add-in functions (e.g., virtual pets, online games, the wall, virtual gifts) that facilitate users to customize their own interface on Facebook".

== Psychology ==
Studies have found that the nature and the level of participation in online social networking sites have been directly correlated with the personality of the participants. The Department of Psychology in the University of Windsor site their findings regarding this correlation in the articles "Personality and motivations associated with Facebook use" and "The Influence of Shyness on the Use of Facebook in an Undergraduate Sample". The articles state that people who have high levels of anxiety, stress, or shyness are more likely to favor socializing through the Internet than in-person socialization. The reason for this is because they are able to communicate with others without being face-to-face, and mediums such as chat rooms give a sense of anonymity which make them feel more comfortable when participating in discussions with others.

Studies also show that in order to increase online participation, the contributors must feel unique, useful, and be given challenging and specific goals. These findings fall in line with the social psychology theories of social loafing and goal setting. Social loafing claims that when people are involved in a group setting, they tend to not contribute as much and depend on the work of others. Goal setting is the theory stating that people will work harder if given a specific goal rather than a broad or general problem. However, other social psychology theories have been disproven to help with online participation. For instance, one study found that users will contribute more to an online group project than an individual one. Additionally, although users enjoy when their contributions are unique, they want a sense of similarity within the online community. Finding similarities with other members of a community encourage new users to participate more and become more active within the community. So, new users must be able to find and recognize similar users already participating in the community. Also, the online community must give a method of analyzing and quantifying the contribution made by any user to visualize their contributions to users and help convince them that they are unique and useful. However, these and other psychological motivations behind online participation are still being researched today.

== Sociology ==
Research has shown that social characteristics, such as socioeconomic status, gender, and age affect users' propensity to participate online. Following sociological research on the digital divide, newer studies indicate a participation divide in the United States (Correa 2010)(Hargittai & Walejko 2008)(Schradie 2011) and the United Kingdom (Blank 2013). Age is the strongest demographic predictor of online participation, while gender differentiates forms of online participation. The effect of socioeconomic status is not found to be strong in all studies (Correa 2010) and (partly) mediated through online skills (Hargittai & Walejko 2008) and self-efficacy. Furthermore, existing social science research on online participation has heavily focused on the political sphere, neglecting other areas, such as education, health or cultural participation (Lutz, Hoffmann & Meckel 2014).

== Participation in the social web ==
Online participation is relevant in different systems of the social web such as:

- Blogging (Nardi et al. 2004)
- Micro-blogging (Java et al. 2007)
- Online dating services (Siibak 2007)
- Social bookmarking (Benbunan-Fich & Koufaris 2008) (Ames & Naaman 2007)
- Social network services (Krasnova et al. 2008) (Schaefer 2008) (Joinson 2008) (Jacobs 2009) (Penenberg 2009)
- Virtual worlds (Yee 2006)
- Wiki (Rafaeli & Ariel 2008) (Oded 2007) (Wilkinson & Huberman 2007)

Nielsen's 90-9-1% rule: "In most online communities, 90% of users are lurkers who never contribute, 9% of users contribute a little, and 1% of users account for almost all the action". It is interesting to point out that the majority of the user population is in fact not contributing to the informational gain of online communities, which leads to the phenomenon of contribution inequality. Often, feedbacks, opinions and editorials are posted from those users who have stronger feelings towards the matter than most others; thus it is often the case that some posts online are not in fact representative of the entire population leading to what is called the Survivorship bias. Therefore, it is important to ease the process of contribution as well as to promote quality contribution to address this concern.

Lior Zalmanson and Gal Oestreicher-Singer showed that participation in the social websites can help boost subscription and conversion rates in these websites.

== See also ==
- Collective intelligence
- Cyberpsychology
- e-participation
- Knowledge ecosystem
- Legitimate peripheral participation
  (in Community of practice)
- Motivations of Wikipedia contributors
- Motivations of open source programmers
- Social actions
- Social cognition
- Social exchange theory
- Social translucence
- Virtual community of practice
