= PROZ =

PROZ may refer to:

- Protein Z, a protein encoded by the PROZ gene.
- ProZ.com, an online translators' community
