= Out Campaign =

Public awareness initiative for freethought and atheism

The scarlet 'A'

The Out Campaign is a public awareness initiative for freethought and atheism in the US. It was initiated by Robin Elisabeth Cornwell, and is endorsed by Richard Dawkins, a prominent atheist. The campaign aims to create more openness about being an atheist by providing a means by which atheists can identify themselves to others by displaying the movement's scarlet letter A, a scarlet colored capital "A" in the Zapfino typeface, and an allusion to the scarlet letter A worn by Hester Prynne, the protagonist in Nathaniel Hawthorne's 1850 novel The Scarlet Letter, after she is convicted of adultery. It encourages those who wish to be part of the campaign to come out and re-appropriate, in a humorous way, the social stigma that in some places persists against atheism, by branding themselves with a scarlet letter.

== Campaign ==
... there is a big closet population of atheists who need to come out.

— Richard Dawkins, 2007

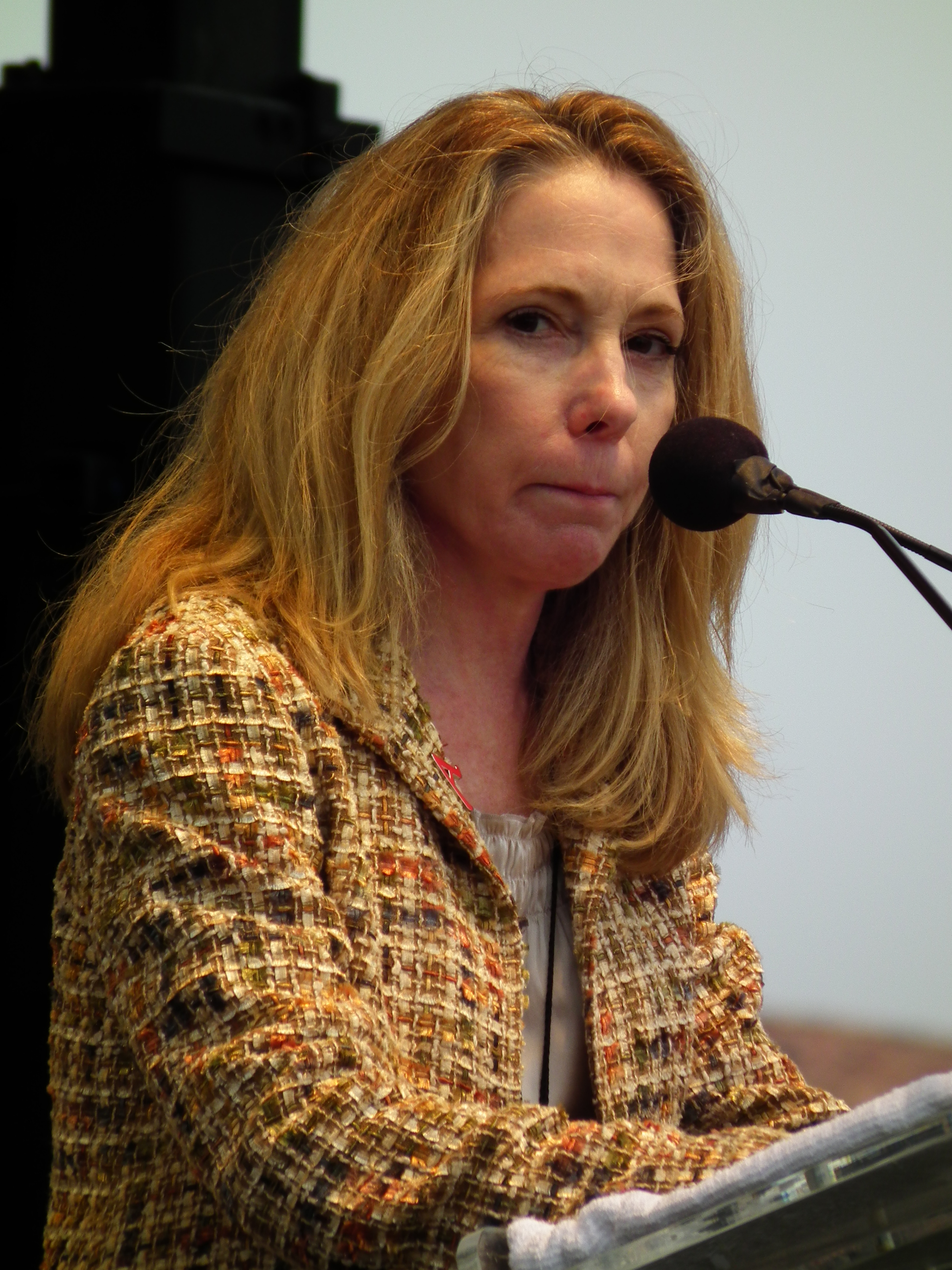
Robin Elisabeth Cornwell in 2012

Cornwell has stated that the gay rights movement was a source of inspiration for the campaign. The campaign, however, encourages one to "out" only oneself; it invites atheists to:

- Reach out and talk to others about atheism and help spread a positive view of atheism
- Speak out about their own beliefs and values without feeling intimidated, thus helping people realize that atheists don't fit stereotypes and are a very diverse group
- Keep out, meaning to promote the idea that religion should be kept out of public schools and government, and that nobody's religious agenda should be allowed to intimidate
- Stand out and become visible in their communities and become involved. An offshoot of Stand out is the Non-Believers Giving Aid campaign, which has raised money to help out in the aftermath of disaster. The A+ symbol used in the campaign refers to Atheists Standing out for their activism in social and humanitarian efforts.

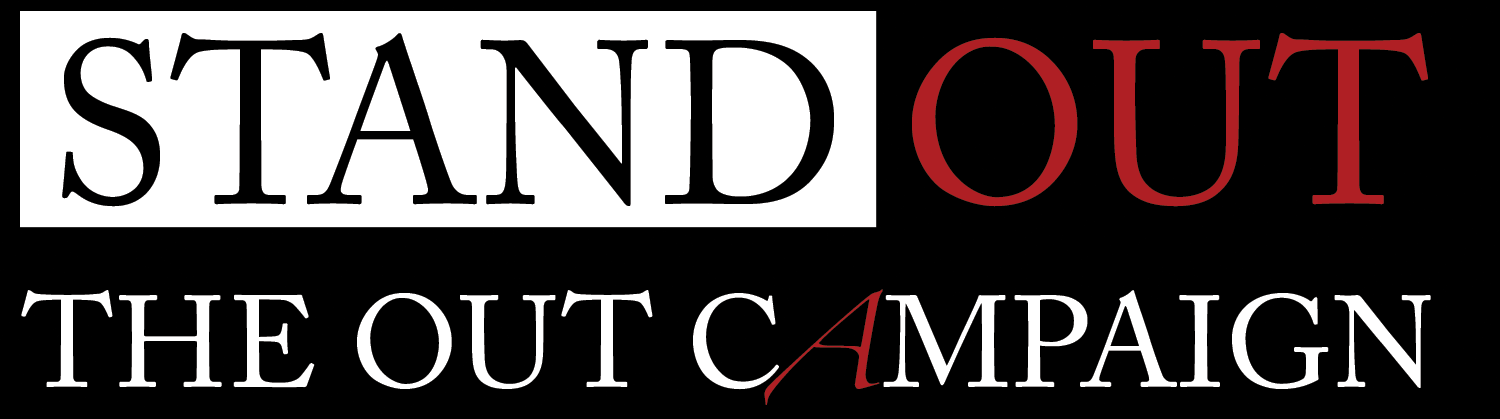
Artwork from T-shirt sleeve

The campaign produces discreet attire that is centered on the scarlet "A", and the term "OUT" which is usually typographically isolated from the rest of the containing phrase. There is no overt mention of atheism other than the use of the symbols. The "A" is one of the most popular symbols for atheism in current usage. Nonetheless, American Christian organizations have begun to respond: the campaign has even been called "a wake-up call" for Christians.

The campaign produced T-shirts, hoodies, bumper stickers, stickers, and lapel pins sold through Richard Dawkins's online store, with the proceeds going to the Richard Dawkins Foundation for Reason and Science.

== Openly Secular ==
In 2014, reflecting an approach similar to the "coming out" strategy of the gay rights movement, a group called Openly Secular was formed to encourage nonreligious and non-theistic Americans to be open about their personal secularity. The group states its mission "is to eliminate discrimination and increase acceptance by getting secular people – including atheists, freethinkers, agnostics, humanists and nonreligious people – to be open about their beliefs." In one video produced for the group, comedian and television personality Bill Maher urges atheists to be open about their religious skepticism, dismissing the Bible as a book "based on ancient myths."

== See also ==
- Brights movement
- Flying Spaghetti Monster
- New Atheism
- Secular movement
