= Participation inequality =

Difference between levels of participation of various groups in certain activities

In social sciences, participation inequality consists of difference between levels of participation of various groups in certain activities. Common examples include:

- differing levels of participation in democratic, electoral politics, by social class, race, gender, etc.
- differing levels of participation in online communities as described by Jakob Nielsen.

In politics, participation inequality typically affects "the kinds of individuals, such as the young, the poor and those with little formal education" who tend to not take the initiative to participate in electoral and related events. State enumeration, such as was done in Canada before the implementation of the National Register of Electors in 1996, "worked to augment voter turnout among all segments of society and thus mitigated the natural tendency toward participation inequality in electoral politics".

== Political participation inequality ==
Political participation inequality refers to how populations differ in political participation when sorted by various characteristics. Most often these groupings are by social class, race, gender, or ethnicity. Widespread political participation inequality often describes when various groups are left out of the political sphere or excluded from various political rights.

Participation inequality usually helps political theorists determine where democracies fail or when political institutions are not democratically responsive. When political systems are too unequal in terms of political participation, it most generally means that there is a breakdown in the ability of all citizens to politically deliberate and distribute various scarce resources, implement comprehensive public policy, or enact needed social reforms. Nations with high amounts of participation inequality are generally characterized as undemocratic although there are certain nations, like India, where low participation inequality has not helped the democratic responsiveness of Indian institutions.

=== Robert Dahl ===
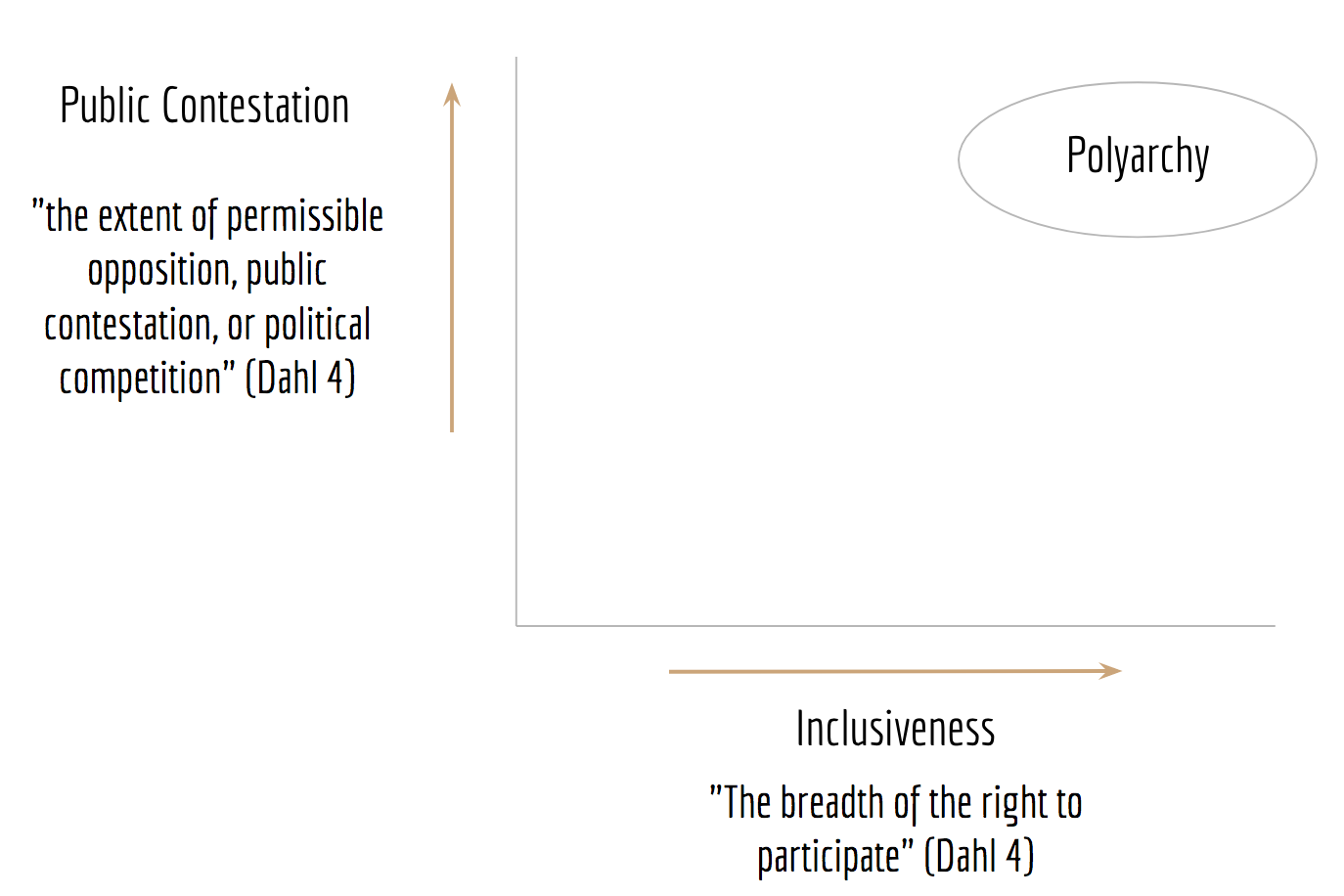
Robert Dahl's two dimensions for evaluating democracies/polarchies

In his 1971 paper Polyarchy: Participation and Opposition, Robert Dahl provided a basic framework to evaluate democracies or polyarchies (nearly/almost full democracies) based on their participation inequality. He argued that there are two dimensions: public contestation – the various rights and procedures guaranteed to citizens – and inclusiveness – how accessible these rights are to all citizens. More fully, public contestation describes the necessary functions for a liberal democracy: a competitive political atmosphere, ability to run for office, right to vote, right to assembly, etc. Inclusiveness describes what portion of the population is able to enjoy these rights and procedures.

Participation inequality is usually represented along the dimension of inclusiveness. So, if a nation were to allow only short people to vote, this political system would have a certain level of public contestation – the right to vote being available – and a certain dimension of inclusiveness – only short people being able to enjoy this right. This system of evaluating democracies enables comparisons of political regimes based on participation inequality by comparing inclusiveness between equally publicly contestable political systems.

=== Causes of political participation ===
==== Dahlian causes ====
Using Dahl’s framework, the first cause of participation inequality can be rooted in a political system’s public policy or in the Dahlian dimension of inclusiveness. Policies that exclude groups based on ethnic identity such as old apartheid South Africa or Iranian exclusion of Sunni political parties best convey systemic political exclusion that is rooted in a regime’s citizenship requirements or public policy.

==== Expansion of Dahl ====
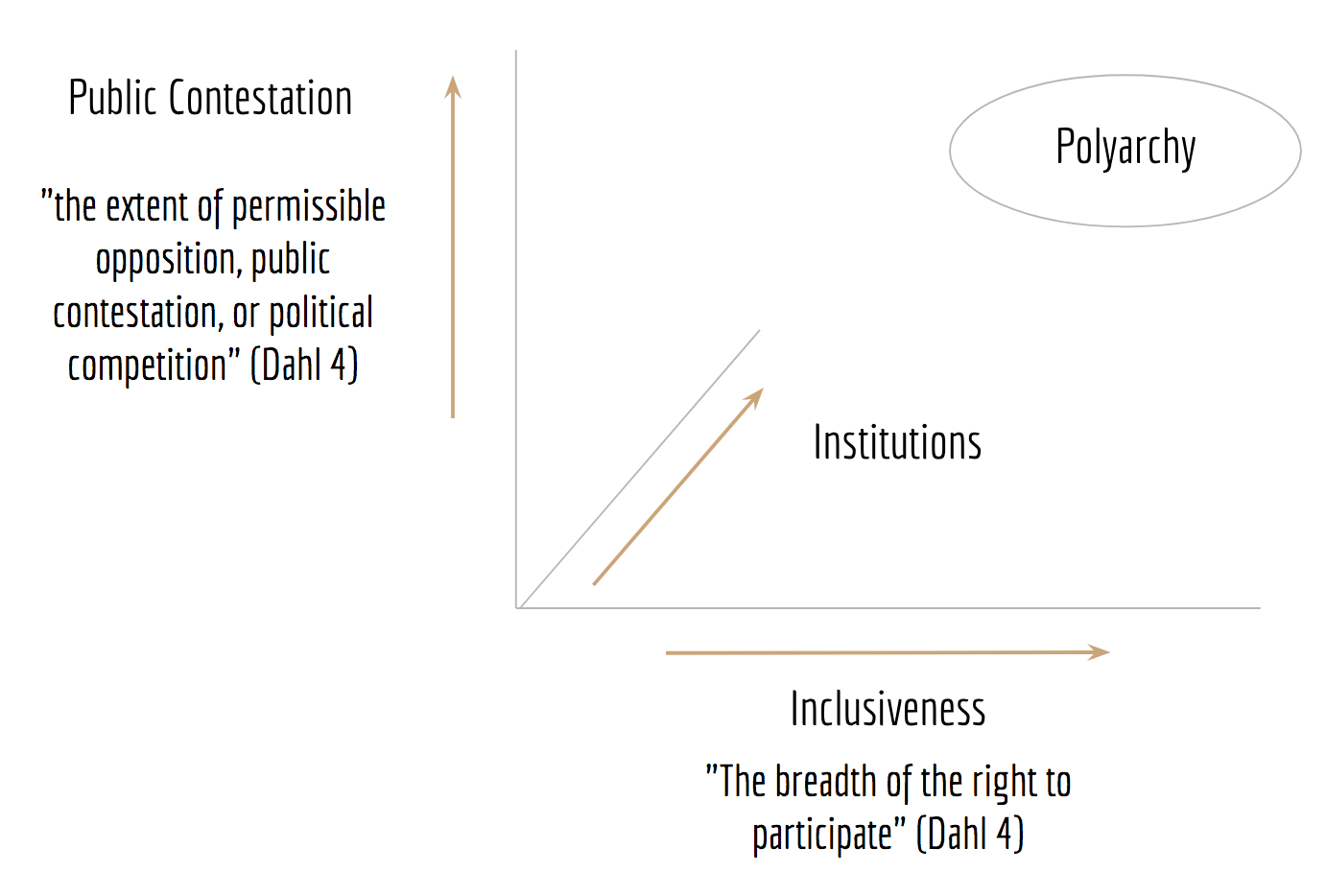
An expansion on Robert Dahl's two dimensions by adding a possible third dimension: institutions

The more insidious cause of participation inequality stems from a third dimension that has been recently added to Dahl’s two-dimensional evaluation of political systems: institutions. In this framework, institutions implement political rights and procedures guaranteed by the state. Institutional causes for participation inequality can include literacy tests, extensive citizenship requirements, sparse voting booths in rural or poor areas, and a lack of public transportation. These all affect the ability of citizens to properly exercise guaranteed rights like voting.

Institutional causes of participation inequality can also be mitigated or exacerbated by cultural norms. Most often high voter turnout usually is hailed as a marker for a democratically responsive nation; however, in India “the turnout rate among the poor is almost as high as for those who are either middle class or rich. A detailed study of voter participation reported for the 2009 national elections shows that voter participation rates do not seem to vary by income status at all...Recent studies report similar findings from Africa and Latin America (Bratton 2008; Boot & Seligson 2008)”. Many of these studies conclude that in developing democracies voting acts as a reassurance of social status or worth in the eyes of the state. This cultural norm has not translated to more democratically responsive institutions in that “the governments created by these elections are known to neglect the interests of the poor and treat them disrespectfully compared to other income groups”. Nations like India are considered to be exceptions to the general rule that economic status has some bearing on voter participation.

==== Economic and educational inequality ====
Economic inequality and educational inequality have often been pointed to as common culprits for political participation inequality. In large part, these two types of inequality are often created and reiterated by political institutions, but most political theorists differentiate these causes for political participation as separate, largely because they are not fully solved by changes in political institutions. While the outcomes of political institutions highly vary from regime to regime, most of the literature finds that high amounts of economic inequality in developed countries depress voter turnout for poorer individuals and increase voter turnout for more affluent individuals (this depends on social cohesion of societies, correlating negatively with affluent political participation when economic inequality is high). Other literature finds that educational inequality depresses voter turnout depending on one’s income level and perceived relative educational status (how one perceives one’s social status and others’ education levels).

== See also ==
- 1% rule
- Pareto principle
