= Lurker =

Non-participating online observer

In Internet culture, a lurker is typically a member of an online community who observes, but does not participate by posting or commenting. The exact definition depends on context. Lurkers make up a large proportion of all users in online communities. Lurking allows users to learn the conventions of an online community before they participate, improving their socialization when they eventually "de-lurk". However, a lack of social contact while lurking sometimes causes loneliness or apathy among lurkers.

Lurkers are referred to using many names, including browsers, read-only participants, non-public participants, legitimate peripheral participants, vicarious learners, or sleepers.

== History ==
Since the beginning of computer-mediated communication lurking has been a concern for community members. The term "lurk" can be traced back to when it was first used during the 14th century. The word referred to someone who would hide in concealment, often for an evil purpose. In the mid-1980s, the word started to be applied to the Internet when bulletin board systems became popular. The bulletin boards were accessed through a single phone line that users would call to upload files and post comments to share with the community. It was expected that those using the system and consuming resources would contribute. Because lurkers would keep the phone line busy for extended periods of time without contributing anything, they were often viewed negatively and would be barred by the system operator who managed the BBS.

Today, lurkers are viewed both positively and negatively. In many communities lurkers are still seen as free-riders. They are perceived as a drain on the public goods since they "take without giving back." However, some communities encourage newbies to lurk. By lurking, newbies can learn more about the culture of the community, understand the community's social norms, and become familiar with the key members of the community. Lurkers are also viewed positively in present-day communities because they provide an audience for the mass media. The presence of lurkers is often the justification for receiving advertising support.

Lurkers are often hard to track in computer-mediated communities. Because they are not posting and mostly just read content, they leave behind few traces that can be tracked. In open source project communities, it is estimated that at any point in time, 50% to 90% of the community may be lurkers. Depending on the community, this may be consistent with the 90-9-1 principle.

== Rationale ==
Lurkers lurk rather than participate for a variety of reasons. A majority of lurkers profess that they lurk simply because they think that browsing is enough for them. Users also choose to lurk in order to find examples to follow when they decide to participate, avoid making redundant posts or contributions, and learn more about the topics of conversation. A lurker's need to learn about the community before contributing also explains why almost twice as many users lurk on technical support communities where more information is required to post as compared to health support communities. Researchers have shown that different motivations underlie reading, contributing, and moderating web forums. Pure lurkers more often are motivated by the fact that the community is the only place to find a certain kind of content, while moderators and contributors are motivated by either duty or feelings of attachment. Lurking on social media can also be a form of receptive reading, whereby users seek to understand the opinions of those with a divergent point of view. In much of the published literature, "lurking" is treated as a personal trait. However, concepts of legitimate peripheral participation and "de-lurking" suggest that lurking may be more situational than dispositional. In a study of online communities in which it was possible to see the total membership list, researchers were able to count the number of members who were public participants in one community while remaining silent or non-public participants in another community. 84% of the members fit this mixed pattern, indicating that people choose whether to lurk or to contribute on a per-community basis.

== Potential benefits ==
=== Lurker benefits ===
Lurking behavior provides some benefits to users. Mo and Coulson found that lurkers on an online support group for HIV/AIDS did not differ from posters in their levels of care, self-efficacy, optimism, depression, and loneliness. They also found that lurkers felt more energetic than posters.

In a study that addressed lurking in E-learning, scholars found evidence that lurking is a helpful type of participation in online courses. Students said that the most common reasons they lurked before posting were to discover a message to reply to, to identify a model to adopt, to bypass providing a similar reply, and to acquire knowledge regarding the topic. Students in this study also expressed that they came back to read posts on online course discussion boards in order to check whether others had responded to their posts or to review a previous concept.

==== Learning community social norms ====
One reason lurkers lurk is the need to learn more about the group. In interviews, lurkers claim a lack of understanding of the community as a reason for not posting. Lurkers often take the time before posting to evaluate the group for how well it is a fit for them. Lurkers learn more about the individuals in the group, the dialogue styles, and the implicit norms and explicit policies. In the interviews, lurkers mentioned that this was their preferred method so that they could avoid making a mistake and being rejected by the group. To determine if the group is a good fit and to learn more about the norms, lurkers will read most if not all of the posts. By reading the posts, lurkers develop a better understanding about the topics being discussed and if this is a good fit for them. Lurkers will also examine email addresses and signatures with associated websites so get a better understanding of the other members of the group.

By taking these steps, lurkers gain more cultural capital. Soroka and Raffaeli define cultural capital as "the knowledge that enables an individual to interpret various cultural codes." In other words, it is the knowledge of the norms of the community. They found that people that lurk longer before posting had greater levels of cultural capital. A lurker can gain cultural capital in a community just by spending a lot of time in it. A person that has more cultural capital will benefit more from the community.

=== Benefits for others ===
In their study on interactive mailing lists, Takahashi, Fujimoto, and Yamasaki demonstrated that "active lurkers", or individuals who spread content from an online group to individuals external to the online group, help spread beneficial information to surrounding communities.

Lurkers can also develop stores of valuable knowledge as they lurk which may be helpful later should they decide to contribute. For example, users in open source software communities can quickly discover the answers to common problems, making them more likely to contribute answers later. If they have already had a question answered, they are even more likely to de-lurk and reciprocate. These behaviors form the backbone of open source technical support.

Lurkers also help reduce the burden on communities. A person who may have a question for a community may be better served searching for the answer than forcing community members to expend effort to see and respond to their query. In the case of open source project communities, the vast majority of questions have already been asked and answered in the community, making any repeated questions wasted work.

Pragmatically, lurkers also provide revenue for communities as they access pages, generating advertising revenue.

== Potential costs ==
=== Lurker costs ===
Lurkers experience less belonging in a community compared to regular contributors. They are less satisfied and experience more distractions. This means that lurkers are predisposed to leave before making a contribution because they lack the motivation that belonging and satisfaction bring. In the case of social networking websites, lurkers experience less intimacy and personal well-being. Lurkers on Facebook can experience loneliness as they watch other, more social members of the community participate.

=== Costs for others ===
Lurkers can also negatively influence other community members. If community members can see that someone is lurking rather than participating, they may feel that they are being spied upon. Lurkers might also take pieces of content featured in communities without seeking consent, violating the rules of the community. As a result, while individuals in online communities may feel that they are experiencing private interactions, a lurker may see it as a public space for observation due to their reduced feelings of belonging. This can become quite extreme in more intimate communities such as chat rooms where lurkers are more obvious. Hudson and Bruckman entered IRC chatrooms as experimenters and either posted a message stating they were logging the chat, an opt-in message for logging, and opt-out message, or nothing at all. 63.3% of chat rooms kicked out the experimenters after they gave any sort of message, demonstrating a dislike of explicit chat logging. However, 29% of rooms kicked out the experimenters even though they did not post anything, showing a disregard for lurkers.

==== Free-riding ====
Lurking is just one form of free-riding that can happen within an Internet community, and is similar to asking questions without responding, or gathering information without distributing it. Lurking is seen as undesirable to communities because of the risk free-riding can have on the community if every member does it. A public good is something that is impossible to exclude someone from and has a joint supply within the community. An Internet community is seen as a public good because it is a pool of data to which people may, if they choose, separately contribute information. The survival of the community is then dependent on the contributions of the members. Since it is impossible to exclude members from sharing in the benefit of the public good, people are more motivated to free-ride on the work of the other members and not contribute themselves. As a group grows in size, the likelihood of free-riding increases. Individuals are less likely to contribute if they do not view their contribution as making a visible difference and if they expect the other members to provide enough content to reach the desired effect. A lurker may withhold information because when they contribute, it benefits everyone in the community except for themselves. When everyone then chooses to withhold information, the collective benefit is no longer produced. With more people free-riding, it is more difficult to produce useful information and interactions among the group members. The group will then not have enough resources to attract new members and retain current members. Lurking can also cost site holders money if they do not use advertising to generate revenue. The bandwidth costs of lurkers visiting a site may outstrip the value that donors or contributors provide to a community.

== Community factors ==
Different factors in the community can influence the lurking behavior within that community. The amount of lurking within a community is correlated with the topic of the community, the size of the community, and the amount of traffic within the community. The number of lurkers is nearly double in technical support groups compared to health support groups. The nature of the topic may be responsible for the difference in the number of lurkers. The number of members in the community can also affect the amount of lurking that takes place. As the number of members in a group rises, the percentage of lurkers also rises. Within a given group size, the groups with higher traffic tend to have a lower percentage of lurkers.

== De-lurking ==
When lurkers decide to participate in the community, they "de-lurk," which Rafaeli, Ravid, and Soroka define as: "...transfer from passive participation (only visiting the forum to read) to active participation (actively posting opinions and thoughts on the forum)".

=== De-lurking and community acceptance ===
In a series of studies investigating how newcomers learn the rules and habits of good users in four types of Usenet groups (i.e., health support, political issues, hobby, and technical groups), Burke, Kraut, and Joyce found correlational and experimental evidence that "group-oriented membership claims" or "de-lurking messages" were well received by previous community members. According to Burke et al., group-oriented membership claims are when new users introduce themselves to the online community by describing their undertakings in learning about the community; the authors provide the following example: "I've been lurking around your discussion group for a few weeks now. Just reading and trying to soak in some knowledge I guess". Correlational results in Study 1 showed that messages with group-oriented membership claims elevated community member responses by 38 percent, while experimental results in Study 2 showed that placing group-oriented membership claims into Usenet posts elevated community member responses by 6 percent.

=== Lurking to participation ===
Some researchers have discovered positive links between social capital, cultural capital, and de-lurking. Others have identified psychological approaches to overcome the barriers to online participation.

According to Rafaeli et al., "...community virtual social capital is 'a collection of features of the social network created as a result of virtual community activities that lead to development of common social norms and rules that assist cooperation for mutual benefit'" (p. 4). Through analyzing e-learning forums, Rafaeli et al. found a positive association between amounts of de-lurking and social capital. Soroka and Rafaeli claim that "virtual cultural capital" is "...an extent to which a person has a reading-based knowledge about a virtual community's culture and other participants, thus having much in common with them." By analyzing the Open University of Israel online forums and two IBM ReachOut online communities, Soroka and Rafaeli found that as users' cultural capital of an online community increases, their amount of activity increases, and they have a higher likelihood of de-lurking. Soroka and Rafaeli also found that irrespective of the amount of cultural capital, de-lurking becomes less likely as time passes.

The design and management of online communities can also affect de-lurking and participation. Resnick, Janney, Buis, and Richardson introduced a community element to the online walking program called Stepping Up to Health and discussed various issues of beginning an online community, including transforming lurkers into users. They discovered that posting contests (i.e., where users who made their first posts during a five-day period qualified to potentially win a prize) were a helpful mechanism to promote posting among lurkers. Similarly, Antin and Cheshire's survey of lurkers suggests that reading behavior in Wikipedia is a sort of participation which helps new users to learn about the online community and advance toward more comprehensive participation.

While Rashid et al. did not examine lurkers directly, they conducted an experimental study on MovieLens that investigated how to raise low contribution rates in online communities. They discovered that participants showed a higher likelihood of rating movies when ratings were valuable to someone than when ratings were associated with the probability of having previously watched a movie. Furthermore, they found that participants showed an enhanced likelihood of rating movies when ratings were valuable to MovieLens subgroups than when ratings were valuable to the entire MovieLens online community, and participants demonstrated an enhanced likelihood of rating movies when ratings were valuable to individuals who liked similar movie genres as the participant than when ratings were valuable to individuals who liked dissimilar movie genres as the participant. These authors also found that participants demonstrated a reduced likelihood of rating movies when ratings were valuable to oneself than when ratings were valuable to someone else. Given these findings, Rashid et al. claim, "…designers can use information about the beneficiaries of contributions to create subtle and integrated messages to increase motivation"(p. 958).

== Methods used to study lurkers ==
Because of the nature of the lurker, they can be hard to study. They do not leave visible traces and it is often difficult to address them directly. To study lurkers, often Internet communities such as email-based discussion lists, public forums, and community building tools will be targeted so communication can be tracked more easily. Methods of studying lurkers include logging, questionnaires, interviews, observation, ethnography, and content and discourse analysis. Logging is a good tool for studying the number of lurkers in a community. It is easy to compare the number of lurkers between communities. Researchers can also collect information on the number of messages, the size of messages, the message content, and message threading. Questionnaires in contrast are better for asking the why and how of lurkers. There is less likely to be a response though because of the nature of lurkers and those that do respond may be a biased sample. Interviews are a good way to gain an understanding of the problem space. Interviews can also be used to answer the question of why and how lurkers lurk. The sampling must be done carefully or there could be a response bias. Observation is a good way to understand the context within the community. This method can be very intrusive though. If the observation is just on the community in general than no information may be gained about the lurkers because they are not visible. By observing a lurker, the tools and methods by which they lurk can be understood. Ethnography is better for understanding a single community but not multiple communities. It again is good for understanding the reasons and activities of lurking. Content and discourse analysis is a good tool to understand the interactions within a community. Since many lurkers do not publicly interact, this tool is better to use when understanding de-lurking.

== See also ==
- 1% rule (Internet culture)
- Astroturfing
- Leech
- Online participation
- Socialization
- Computer-supported cooperative work
- Parasitism (social offense)
- Academic audit
