= Peter Kollock =

American sociologist

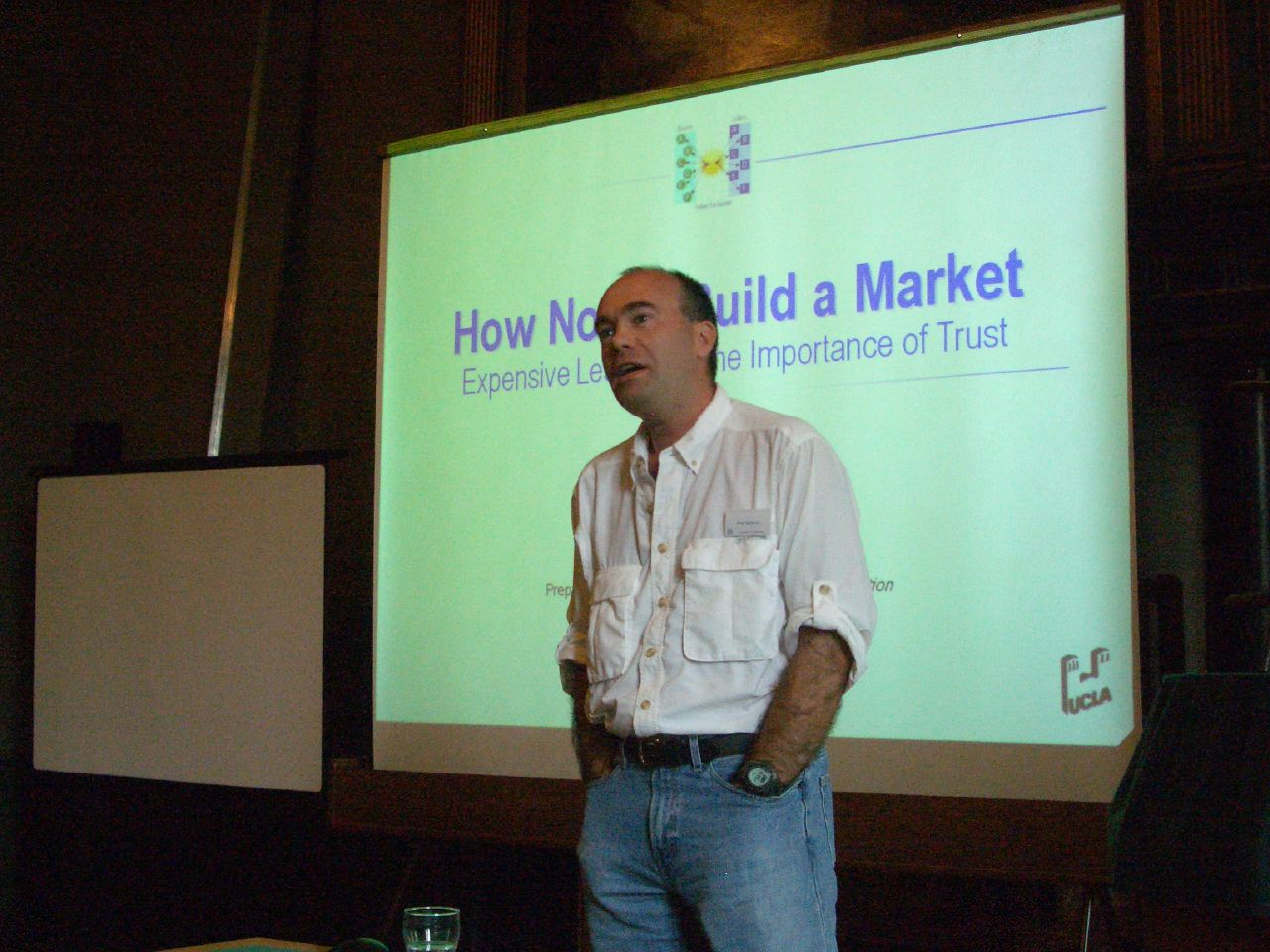
- Peter Kollock
- Born: November 1, 1959; Zaragoza, Spain
- Died: January 10, 2009 (aged 49); Calabasas, California
- Occupation: Professor
- Writing career
- Genre: Sociology
- Subjects: Collective action, Virtual communities

Peter Enrique Kollock (November 1, 1959 – January 10, 2009) was an American sociologist and an associate professor and vice chair in the department of sociology at the University of California, Los Angeles.

== Background ==
Kollock was born on November 1, 1959, in Zaragoza, Spain but came to the United States when he was a year old. He grew up in Seattle, Washington and attended Blanchet High School. Later, he received his B.A. in 1982, M.A in 1984, and Ph.D. in 1990 from the department of sociology at the University of Washington. He joined the department of sociology at UCLA in 1989 and stayed there throughout his entire career.

== Career ==
His research interests lay in "determining the basis of trust and cooperation in collective action." One aspect of this research explored collaboration and online participation in virtual communities, arguing that cooperation is sustained by credit and relatively loose accounting systems. He was a practicing Buddhist and taught the popular fiat lux seminar, “Zen and the Art of Mindfulness.” Following a retreat at the Deer Park Monastery, Kollock proposed a new undergraduate course, "The Sociology of Mindfulness," which became very popular. He was also a motorcycle enthusiast.

Kollock died on 10 January 2009 in a motorcycle accident on highway 101 near Calabasas, California. According to Buddhist Monk Phap De, "Peter was a very skillful and careful motorcycle rider. He had just said good-bye to his wife, Ellen, and, apparently, was on his way from Calabasas to UCLA. According to the police, Peter, was hit by a powerful cross wind, causing him to hit the curb. His body was catapulted into a tree, killing him instantly." The Peter Kollock Memorial Ride was held on 14 January 2009, a 65-mile/two-hour route that ended at the UCLA campus in time for the memorial service. The department of sociology at UCLA now offers the Peter Kollock Memorial Teaching Award.

== Works ==
=== Book ===
- Smith, Marc, and Peter Kollock (editors). 1999. Communities in Cyberspace. London: Routledge.

=== Selected papers ===
- Kollock, Peter, and Marc Smith. 1996. "Managing the Virtual Commons: Cooperation and Conflict in Computer Communities." pp. 109–128 in Computer-Mediated Communication: Linguistic, Social, and Cross-Cultural Perspectives, edited by Susan Herring. Amsterdam: John Benjamins.
- Kollock, Peter. 1996. "Design Principles for Online Communities." Harvard Conference on the Internet and Society. Also published in PC Update 15(5): 58–60. June 1998.
- Kollock, Peter. 1998. "Annual Review of Sociology - Social Dilemmas: Anatomy of Cooperation"
- Kollock, Peter. 1999. "The Production of Trust in Online Markets." Advances in Group Processes (Vol. 16), edited by E. J. Lawler, M. Macy, S. Thye, and H. A. Walker. Greenwich, CT: JAI Press.
- Kollock, Peter, and Marc Smith. 1999. "Introduction: Communities in Cyberspace." pp. 3–25 in Communities in Cyberspace, edited by Marc Smith and Peter Kollock. London: Routledge.
- Kollock, Peter (1999). "The Economies of Online Cooperation: Gifts and Public Goods in Cyberspace". In Smith, Marc; Kollock, Peter (eds.). Communities in Cyberspace. London: Routledge. pp. 220–239.
- Kollock, Peter, and E. Russell Braziel. 2006. “How Not to Build an Online Market: The Sociology of Market Microstructure.” Advances in Group Processes: Social Psychology of the Workplace, edited by S. R. Thye and E. J. Lawler. New York: Elsevier Science.

=== Presentations and videos ===
- IFTF/Stanford University Humanities lab lecture by Kollock - hosted by Howard Rheingold
- Peter Kollock on Social Dilemmas on YouTube - 2005 lecture for a Stanford seminar on "A new literacy of cooperation" - conducted by Andrea Saveri and Howard Rheingold.
