= Translators Without Borders =

U.S. nonprofit organization

Translators without Borders
- Founded: 1993 (as Traducteurs Sans Frontières)
- Founder: Lori Thicke; Ros Smith-Thomas
- Type: Non-profit
- Tax ID no.: Translators without Borders US, Inc.
- Registration no.: Translators without Borders US, Inc.
- Purpose: Humanitarian and development assistance
- Location: Danbury, United States
- Origins: Paris, France
- Region served: Worldwide
- Method: Translation, language and content services
- Key people: Andrew Bredenkamp (Board Chair); Aimee Ansari (Executive Director)
- Employees: 30–50
- Volunteers: over 100,000
- Website: translatorswithoutborders.org

Translators without Borders (TWB) is a non-profit organization set up to provide translation services for humanitarian non-profits. It was established in 2010 as a sister organization of Traducteurs Sans Frontières, founded in 1993 by Lori Thicke and Ros Smith-Thomas. As of 2022, it had over 100,000 members. TWB's objective is to address language disparities that impede crucial humanitarian efforts. They aim to accomplish this by facilitating collaboration between non-profit humanitarian entities and a volunteer community of translators.

The organization provides services to humanitarian non-profit organizations in need of translated content. Some of these include Doctors Without Borders, Medecins du Monde, UNICEF, Oxfam, Handicap International. They are known for translating information about reports, vital health information, and crisis response material for organizations responding to emergencies in different countries, such as Burundi, Liberia and Greece. The organization translates over 10 million words per year. According to their website, Translators without Borders has donated over 50 million translated words to non-profits.

On June 15, 2017, TWB and The Rosetta Foundation (TRF) agreed to merge operations. The merger was announced at the Localization World conference in Barcelona.

== Working with translators ==
=== Translators without Borders translation platform ===
ProZ.com created an online automated translation platform for Translators without Borders in May 2011. This translation center was referred to as the Translators without Borders Workspace. Approved non-profits post translation projects are picked up by translators voluntarily.

The workspace was effective in increasing translation speed. When projects were handled manually, TWB translated 29 projects, with 37,000 words of text, in seven language pairs, for nine different organizations. In January 2012, seven months after the Translators without Borders Workspace was completed, they translated 183 projects, with 280,000 words, in 25 language pairs, for 24 organizations. In 2015 Translators without Borders reported to have delivered 7 million translated words through 780 projects to 214 aid organizations. In early 2017, TWB upgraded its translation platform by adding machine assisted translation technology and translation memory. The enhanced platform was named Kató. In June 2017 Translators without Borders merged with The Rosetta Foundation, an Irish registered non-profit organization is known to relieve poverty, support healthcare, develop education and promote justice through equal access to information and knowledge across the languages of the world.

=== Volunteers ===
TWB accepts applications from professional translators and people who are fluent in at least one language other than their native language. There is a streamlined process for applicants holding certifications from American Translators Association, Lionbridge, ProZ.com Certified PRO or with those with a MITI qualification from the Institute of Translating and Interpreting. Since merging with The Rosetta Foundation in mid-2017, TWB has acquired over 26,000 volunteers.

== Projects ==
=== Words of Relief project ===
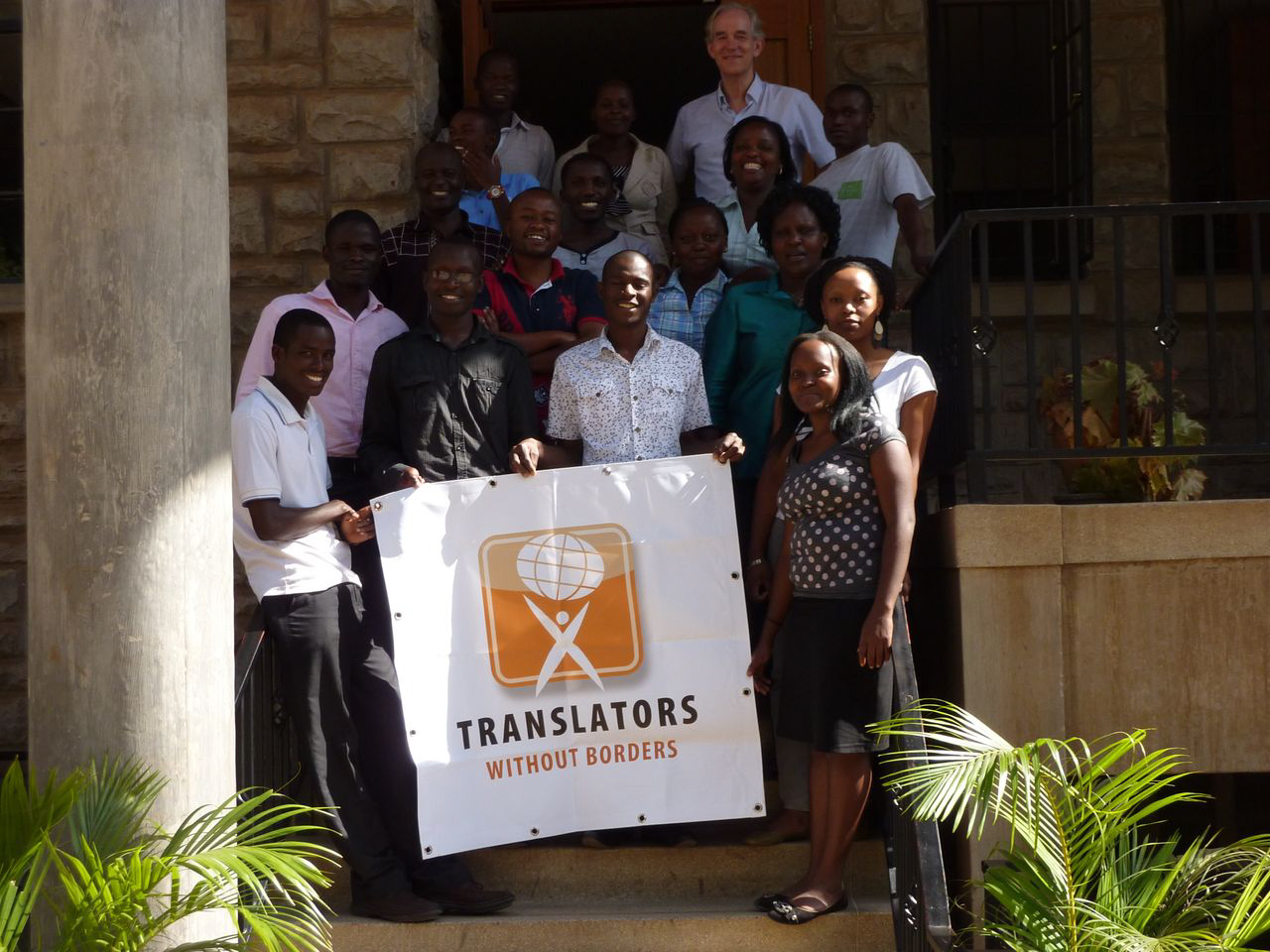
The Spider Network volunteers for the Words of Relief project

A video which communicates the effectiveness of translation in increasing communications with communities, and highlights the critical importance of local language communications in health, education and crisis situations.

Infograph showing the impact of translation

Words of Relief (WoR) is a translation crisis relief network which aims to improve communications when the crisis response humanitarian workers and affected populations do not speak the same language. They are responsible for the following:

- Translating key crisis and disaster messages into the relevant languages and openly distributing them ahead of potential crises.
- Building a network of translators around the world who can translate from world languages into regional languages and who are trained to assist immediately.
- Creating a crowd sourced, online (and mobile) application that connects the translation team with aid workers and data aggregators who need immediate help (entitled the Words of Relief Digital Exchange – WoRDE).

Words of Relief was piloted from January 2014 to May 2015 in Nairobi, Kenya and concentrated on Swahili and Somali. Approximately 475,000 words of crisis relief content from various sources including the Infoasaid Message Library were translated.

The Words of Relief model has been deployed to respond to several crises worldwide, including the Ebola emergency in West Africa and the 2015 Nepal earthquake. Response Teams in Arabic, Persian, Greek, Kurdish and Urdu also provide rapid translations for aid organizations along the refugee route in Europe. Teams of professional volunteers work with partners to translate information on reception centres and ferry strikes, signage for the centres, and health information.

Words of Relief relies on a crowd-sourced, online (and mobile) application, called the Words of Relief Digital Exchange (WoRDE). The platform was launched in 2014 and it connects teams of rapid response translators with aid workers to do translations during a sudden onset crisis.

Words of Relief is supported by the Humanitarian Innovation Fund, a program managed by ELRHA. The Words of Relief Digital Exchange is funded by Microsoft's Technology for Good.

=== The HealthPhone project ===
Translators without Borders is in partnership with the Mother and Child Health and Education Trust in India. HealthPhone, which was founded and created by Nand Wadhwani, creates health videos that are preloaded to phones throughout India and other countries that speak Indo-Aryan languages. The videos cover a variety of health issues, such as breastfeeding, malnutrition, post-natal and newborn care, and more.

Through translators, videos are subtitled so that people throughout India (and in Africa) who do not speak or read the source language can learn from the videos. So far videos have been subtitled into about 10 Indo-Aryan languages, Swahili and Spanish.

=== Simple Words for Health ===
Simple Words for Health (SWFH), a simplified medical terminology resource, was set up in 2014. SWFH is a database of 12,000 essential medical terms that have been simplified and translated into more than 40 world languages by qualified doctors and trained medical translators.

=== Wikipedia ===
In 2011, Translators without Borders began a collaborative effort to translate medical articles on English Wikipedia into other languages. The WikiProject Medicine Translation Task Force initially focused on 80 medical articles with the goal of achieving good article or featured article status on those articles. After the improvement of the articles, they are then translated into simplified English by Content Rules (the simplified English is provided on the Wikipedia simplified English site). The organization aims to translate these articles into all 285 languages Wikipedia offers. Articles are also translated into spoken Wikipedia. This process is expected to take several years.

=== Training Center in Kenya ===
In April 2012, Translators without Borders opened its first Healthcare Translation Center in Nairobi, Kenya. New translators in the centre are trained to work in Kiswahili, as well as a number of the other 42 languages spoken in Kenya. Since the Center was first launched in 2012, basic translation training has been provided to over 250 people. This project focuses on healthcare information translated into Swahili.

The purpose of the Healthcare Translation Center is to train local Kenyans with backgrounds in language or health to become professional translators. These translators assist in the process of getting healthcare information out in Swahili.

== Management ==
Translators without Borders is managed by a board of directors. Day-to-day operations are managed by a staff who report to an Executive Director and senior management staff.

== Criticism ==
Concerns have been raised about possible conflicts of interest within TWB's board of directors and Board of Advisors, because of the presence of major industry players who own or operate commercial concerns. These concerns seem to have caused former members of the board to step down. Among the ethically questionable practices that have been pointed out, there is the fact that texts translated on a voluntary basis benefit corporations represented on the TWB board, that these corporations might have leveraged "unpaid crowdsourcing" to improve machine translation solutions, and that TWB "has helped profit-making concerns [...] obtain public monies for developing valuable digital media translation solutions". Baker and Piróth define as "problematic" the fact that some of the "participating for-profits" in TWB's projects are "handsomely paid", while those who undertake translation tasks are "systematically asked to work on a volunteer basis".

== See also ==
- Science and Development Network
