= The Scarlet Letter (1973 film) =

- Directed by: Wim Wenders
- Written by: Tankred Dorst; Ursula Ehler; Bernardo Fernández; Wim Wenders
- Based on: The Scarlet Letter; 1850 novel by Nathaniel Hawthorne
- Starring: Senta Berger; Lou Castel; Hans Christian Blech
- Cinematography: Robby Müller
- Edited by: Peter Przygodda
- Music by: Jürgen Knieper
- Production company: Filmverlag der Autoren; WDR; Elías Querejeta Producciones Cinematográficas
- Distributed by: Filmverlag der Autoren (West Germany)
- Release dates: 13 March 1973 (West Germany); 3 June 1975 (Spain)
- Running time: 86 minutes
- Countries: West Germany; Spain
- Language: German

The Scarlet Letter (German: Der Scharlachrote Buchstabe) is a 1973 period drama film directed by Wim Wenders, based on Nathaniel Hawthorne's 1850 novel of the same name. The West German-Spanish co-production stars Senta Berger as Hester Prynne, Lou Castel as Reverend Dimmesdale, and Hans Christian Blech as Chillingworth.

== Cast ==
- Senta Berger as Hester Prynne
- Lou Castel as Reverend Arthur Dimmesdale
- Hans Christian Blech as Roger Chillingworth
- Yelena Samarina as Mistress Hibbins
- Alfredo Mayo as Governor Mayo
- Yella Rottländer as Pearl Prynne
- Ángel Álvarez as Reverend Wilson
- William Layton as Governor Bellingham
- Laura Currie as Sarah
- Lorenzo Robledo as Ship Captain
- Rüdiger Vogler as Sailor

== Production ==
Filming took place at a studio in Cologne, with exteriors shot in Galicia, Spain. The look of the evening shots outdoors utilized the existing day for night techniques of exposure.

According to the director's commentary, Wim Wenders explained that the experience of directing this, his second film, was the usual one which occurs with a new director. It is much more difficult and much less successful. In the interior shots, the windows were covered with a variant of washi paper seen in traditional Japanese homes.

Wenders has said that he was unhappy that the movie was filmed on locations in Spain instead of Massachusetts, noting his relative youth made him not prepared to make a 16th-century period movie.

There are a few brief shots in which one sees a three-masted ship on the ocean in the background. This was not a real ship but was a small model sized correctly for the shot and hung in front of the lens (called forced perspective). Only one extra building had to be erected in Galicia for the exterior shooting to hide the large gap between buildings.

As far as the actors were concerned, they were from all over Europe and so all of the dialogue had to be looped afterward. Six or seven different languages were being spoken by the actors. The extras which represent the inhabitants of Salem were all Spaniards.

== See also ==
- Scarlet Letter (disambiguation), a disambiguation page for other film versions of the story
