= ProZ.com =

Website for hiring freelance translators

ProZ.com Inc.
- Company type: Private
- Website type: Social network service
- Available in: English, French, German, Italian, Portuguese, Spanish, Romanian, Russian, Turkish, etc.
- Founded: Syracuse, New York (1999)
- Area served: Worldwide
- Owner: Henry Dotterer
- Founder: Henry Dotterer
- Employees: 29 (2020)
- Website: ProZ.com
- Commercial: Yes
- Registration: Required
- Users: 1,118,765 (October 2020)
- Launched: November 1999
- Current status: Active

ProZ.com is a membership-based website targeting freelance translators. Founded in 1999, it is mainly used for posting and responding to translation job offers. As of 20 October 2018, ProZ.com reports more than 960,000 registered users, spanning more than 200 countries and territories worldwide.

The site is available in more than 45 languages and is being localized in 35 other languages, although localization is not complete for many languages, the default setting being English. QuantCast reports ProZ.com has 220,000 monthly unique U.S. visitors.

The website is not restricted to professional translators and hosts a number of semi-professional and amateur translators. It is open to anyone, without proof of competency or legal registration, although members can submit degree certificates and other qualifications for verification.

== Features and information ==
ProZ.com is based in Syracuse, New York, United States, and it has offices in La Plata, Argentina and Kharkiv, Ukraine.

The site features a virtual community of translators and offers a wide range of resources. Registered users are able to broadcast their professional identity as translators on the internet and receive job offers in the mail with the appropriate language combinations. Registration is required for most services. It also provides discussion forums and online glossaries. Although much of the website requires paid membership in order to be used, and the website receives income from paid advertising, the site has been developed with the help of unpaid volunteers. One remarkable feature is its terminology questions, asked and answered by users; more than 2 million term translation questions have been answered via the site.

The website features reputation systems: WWA for translators and the BlueBoard for outsourcers.

Inc. Magazine rates the service as "a helpful resource for small translation projects" but because only paid members could see the going rates, "non-members may have trouble figuring out how much to offer.". (That rate information has since been made public.)

A Guardian blog article published in April 2012 referred to ProZ.com as "the world's largest translator organisation".

On September 30, 2009, the site organized a virtual conference that attracted a large number of attendees. Annual virtual translation conferences have been held since then, and are open to anyone with a registered profile on the site.

== Cooperation with non-profits ==
Apart from their own ProZ Pro Bono initiative, ProZ.com has also contributed programming services and a work platform, and access to its database of translators to the non-profit group Translators Without Borders. It also cooperated with non-profit Ashoka, and has sponsored events held by the American Translators Association and others in the past.

In particular, ProZ.com is hosting and powering the translation platform used by Translators Without Borders to deliver over 2.5 million words in 2011 and 4.5 million words in 2012, donated by volunteers to humanitarian organizations. This includes the translation into several languages of Wikipedia medical articles as part of the WikiProject Medicine.

== Scams ==
Numerous cases of scamming and identity theft (including large-scale data harvesting) have been reported and preventive measures taken to address the problems.
