= Reputation capital =

Reputation capital is the quantitative measure of some entity's reputational value in some context – a community or marketplace. In the world of Web 2.0, what is increasingly valuable is trying to measure the effects of collaboration and contribution to community. Reputation capital is often seen as a form of non-cash remuneration for their efforts, and generally generates respect within the community or marketplace where the capital is generated.

== Examples ==
- eBay has a seller rating that attempts to represent trustworthiness of a seller. A negative rating of 1% can decrease the selling price of an item by 4%.
- Google's PageRank is a measure of popularity of a site, and for individual blogs, gives a rating of this, and as a result, of the bloggers themselves.
- Technorati has an authority rating based on incoming links to blogs that it has found in its Blogosphere
- This has been more coarsely defined as A, B, or C-list blogger rating.
- Slashdot and reddit's karma mechanisms

== Definition ==
For a business, reputation capital is the sum of the value of all corporate intangible assets, which include: business processes, patents, trademarks; reputations for ethics and integrity; quality, safety, sustainability, security, and resilience.

Delivering functional and social expectations of the public on the one hand and manage to build a unique identity on the other hand creates trust and this trust builds the informal framework of a company. This framework provides "return in cooperation" and produces Reputation Capital. A positive reputation will secure a company or organisation long-term competitive advantages. The higher the Reputation Capital, the less the costs for supervising and exercising control.

Reputation capital is a corporate asset that can be managed, accumulated and traded in for trust, legitimisation of a position of power and social recognition, a premium price for goods and services offered, a stronger willingness among shareholders to hold on to shares in times of crisis, or a stronger readiness to invest in the company's stock.

== See also ==
- Goodwill
- Online reputation
- Reputation
- Reputation management
