= Scarlet Letter (disambiguation) =

The Scarlet Letter is an 1850 novel by Nathaniel Hawthorne (and the eponymous scarlet "A" mentioned therein).

The Scarlet Letter, Scarlet Letters or The Scarlet Letters may also refer to:

== Music and theatre ==
- The Scarlet Letter (Damrosch opera), an 1896 opera based on the novel
- The Scarlet Letter (Kroll opera), a 1965 opera composed by Fredric Kroll based on the novel
- The Scarlet Letter (Laitman opera), a 2008 opera based on the novel
- The Scarlet Letter (album), a 2014 album by Lil' Mo
- "Scarlet Letters" (song), a 2009 song by Mudvayne

== Films ==
- The Scarlet Letter (1908 film), starring Gene Gauntier and Jack Conway
- The Scarlet Letter (1911 film), an American film starring Lucille Young and King Baggot
- The Scarlet Letter (1913 film), an American film starring Linda Arvidson and Murdock MacQuarrie
- The Scarlet Letter (1917 film), starring Mary Martin and Stuart Holmes
- The Scarlet Letter (1922 film), a British film starring Sybil Thorndike and Tony Fraser
- The Scarlet Letter (1926 film), an American film starring Lillian Gish and Lars Hanson
- The Scarlet Letter (1934 film), an American film starring Colleen Moore and Hardie Albright
- The Scarlet Letter (1973 film), a German film starring Senta Berger and Hans Christian Blech
- The Scarlet Letter (1995 film), an American film starring Demi Moore, Gary Oldman, and Robert Duvall
- The Scarlet Letter (2004 film), a South Korean mystery/thriller starring Han Suk-kyu, Lee Eun-ju, and Sung Hyun-ah

== Other uses ==
- The Scarlet Letter (miniseries), a 1979 TV miniseries starring Meg Foster, Kevin Conway, and John Heard
- The Scarlet Letters, a 1953 novel by Ellery Queen
- Scarlet A, logo of Out Campaign
- The Scarlet Letter, yearbook for Rutgers University in New Brunswick, New Jersey
