= 1% rule =

Hypothesis that more people will lurk in a virtual community than will participate

Pie chart showing the proportion of lurkers, contributors and creators under the 90–9–1 principle

In Internet culture, the 1% rule is a general rule of thumb pertaining to participation in an Internet community, stating that only 1% of the users of a website actively create new content, while the other 99% of the participants only lurk. Variants include the 1–9–90 rule (sometimes 90–9–1 principle or the 89:10:1 ratio), which states that in a collaborative website such as a wiki, 90% of the participants of a community only consume content, 9% of the participants change or update content, and 1% of the participants add content.

Similar rules are known in information science; for instance, the 80/20 rule known as the Pareto principle states that 20 percent of a group will produce 80 percent of the activity, regardless of how the activity is defined.

== Definition and review ==
According to the 1% rule, about 1% of Internet users create content, while 99% are just consumers of that content. For example, for every person who posts on a forum, generally about 99 other people view that forum but do not post. The term was coined by authors and bloggers Ben McConnell and Jackie Huba, although there were earlier references this concept that did not use the name.

The terms lurk and lurking, in reference to online activity, are used to refer to online observation without engaging others in the Internet community.

A 2007 study of radical jihadist Internet forums found 87% of users had never posted on the forums, 13% had posted at least once, 5% had posted 50 or more times, and only 1% had posted 500 or more times.

A 2014 peer-reviewed paper entitled "The 1% Rule in Four Digital Health Social Networks: An Observational Study" empirically examined the 1% rule in health-oriented online forums. The paper concluded that the 1% rule was consistent across the four support groups, with a handful of "Superusers" generating the vast majority of content. A study later that year, from a separate group of researchers, replicated the 2014 van Mierlo study in an online forum for depression. Results indicated that the distribution frequency of the 1% rule fit followed Zipf's law, which is a specific type of power law.

The "90–9–1" version of this rule states that for websites where users can both create and edit content, 1% of people create content, 9% edit or modify that content, and 90% view the content without contributing. However, the actual percentage is likely to vary depending upon the subject. For example, if a forum requires content submissions as a condition of entry, the percentage of people who participate will probably be significantly higher than 1%, but the content producers will still be a minority of users. This is validated in a study conducted by Michael Wu, who uses economics techniques to analyze the participation inequality across hundreds of communities segmented by industry, audience type, and community focus.

The 1% rule is often misunderstood to apply to the Internet in general, but it applies more specifically to any given Internet community. It is for this reason that one can see evidence for the 1% principle on many websites, but aggregated together one can see a different distribution. This latter distribution is still unknown and likely to shift, but various researchers and pundits have speculated on how to characterize the sum total of participation. Research in late 2012 suggested that only 23% of the population (rather than 90%) could properly be classified as lurkers, while 17% of the population could be classified as intense contributors of content. Several years prior, results were reported on a sample of students from Chicago where 60% of the sample created content in some form.

== Participation inequality ==
A similar concept was introduced by Will Hill of AT&T Laboratories and later cited by Jakob Nielsen; this was the earliest known reference to the term "participation inequality" in an online context. The term regained public attention in 2006 when it was used in a strictly quantitative context within a blog entry on the topic of marketing.

== See also ==
- Digital citizen
- Internet culture
- List of Internet phenomena
- Lotka's law
- Netocracy
- Silent majority
- Sturgeon's law
- User-generated content
