= Mark C. Suchman =

American sociologist (born 1960)

Mark C. Suchman (born 1960) is an American sociologist, Professor in Sociology at Purdue University, and the Executive Director of the American Bar Foundation. A Professor Emeritus from Brown University, Suchman is known for his work on Institutional theory, and particularly on "managing legitimacy."

== Biography ==
Suchman obtained his AB in sociology at Harvard University in 1983 and his MA in sociology in 1985 at Stanford University. At Stanford he also obtained his PhD in sociology in 1994 with the thesis entitled "On Advice of Counsel: Law Firms and Venture Capital Funds as Information Intermediaries in the Structuration of Silicon Valley", under the supervision of W. Richard Scott. In addition, he holds a JD from Yale Law School (1989).

Suchman started his academic career as a research assistant under Harrison White at Harvard in 1982. At Stanford from 1985 to 1989, he was a teaching assistant, subsequently, of Morris Zelditch, Ann Swidler, Nancy Tuma and Lawrence Wu. In 1993, he started at the University of Wisconsin–Madison as assistant professor of sociology and law, and was promoted to associate professor in 1998, and full professor in 2003. In 2008, he moved to Brown University, Rhode Island, where he was appointed Professor of Sociology. From 2011 to 2012, he was program director for Social, Human and Organizational Factors and Resources in the National Science Foundation's Division of Advanced Cyberinfrastructure.

Suchman was awarded a National Merit Scholarship in 1979, a Harvard College Scholarship in 1980 and a NSF Graduate Research Fellowship from 1984 to 1988. He was a Robert Wood Johnson Foundation Scholar in health policy research at Yale in 1999-2001, and a fellow in residence at the Center for Advanced Study in the Behavioral Sciences in 2001-03.

He has chaired the American Sociological Association's Sections on the Sociology of Law (2005-2006) and Organizations, Occupations, and Work (2016-2017), and has served on the board of trustees of the Law and Society Association (2005-2008).

== Work ==
=== "Managing Legitimacy: Strategic and Institutional Approaches", 1995 ===
In his article "Managing Legitimacy: Strategic and Institutional Approaches'", Suchman defines legitimacy as "a generalized perception or assumption that the actions of an entity are desirable, proper, appropriate within some socially constructed system of norms, values, beliefs, and definitions."

He later adds to this definition, stating that because legitimacy is socially conferred, legitimacy is independent of individual participants, while dependent upon the collective constituency. In other words, an organization is legitimate when it enjoys public approval, even though the actions of an organization might deviate from particular individual interests.

Suchman states three types of legitimacy:

- pragmatic legitimacy,
- moral legitimacy, and
- cognitive legitimacy.

=== Pragmatic legitimacy ===
Pragmatic legitimacy relies upon the self-interests of an organizations constituencies, in which the constituency scrutinizes actions and behaviors taken by the organization in order to determine their effects. This is further broken down into three sub-sections:

- exchange legitimacy,
- influence legitimacy, and
- dispositional legitimacy.

Suchman defines exchange legitimacy as the support for organizational policies due to the policy's benefit to the constituencies.

Influence legitimacy is the support for the organization not due to the benefits that constituencies believe they will receive, but rather due to their belief that the organization will be responsive to their larger interests.

Dispositional legitimacy is defined as support for an organization due to the good attributes constituencies believe the organization has, such as trustworthiness, decency, or wisdom. This is due to the fact that people typically personify organizations and characterize them as being autonomous.

=== Moral legitimacy ===
Moral legitimacy is dependent upon whether the actions of an organization or institution are judged to be moral. In other words, if the constituency believe the organization is breaking the rules of the political or economic system for immoral reasons, then this can threaten moral legitimacy. Suchman breaks moral legitimacy down into four sub-sections:

- consequential legitimacy,
- procedural legitimacy,
- structural legitimacy, and
- personal legitimacy.

Consequential legitimacy relates to what an organization has accomplished based on criteria that is specific to that organization. Procedural legitimacy can be obtained by an organization by adhering to socially formalized and accepted procedures (e.g. regulatory oversight). In the case of structural legitimacy, people view an organization as legitimate because its structural characteristics allow it to do specific kinds of work.

Suchman refers to this organization as being the "right organization for the job." Lastly, personal legitimacy refers to legitimacy that is derived from the charisma of individual leaders.

=== Cognitive legitimacy ===
Cognitive legitimacy is created when an organization pursues goals that society deems to be proper and desirable. Constituency support for the organization is not due to self-interest, but rather due to its taken-for-granted character. When an organization has reached this taken-for-granted status, an organization is beyond dissent. While moral and pragmatic legitimacy deal with some form of evaluation, cognitive legitimacy does not. Instead, with cognitive legitimacy society accepts these organizations as being necessary or inevitable.

== Selected publications ==
- Suchman, Mark C. On Advice of Counsel: Law Firms and Venture Capital Funds as Information Intermediaries in the Structuration of Silicon Valley. 1994

Articles, a selection:

- Suchman, Mark C. "Managing legitimacy: Strategic and institutional approaches", Academy of Management Review, 20.3 (1995): 571-610.
- Suchman, Mark C., and Lauren B. Edelman. "Legal rational myths: The new institutionalism and the law and society tradition", Law & Social Inquiry, 21.4 (1996): 903-941.
- Edelman, Lauren B., and Mark C. Suchman. "The legal environments of organizations", Annual Review of Sociology (1997): 479-515.
