= Naymz =

Social networking platform

Naymz.com
- Type: Private
- Founded: January 2006
- Founder: Nolan Bayliss, Tony Czupryna, Tom Drugan
- Headquarters: Chicago, Illinois, USA
- Key people: Aaron Cooper, Advisor
- Website: Naymz

Naymz.com was a professional social networking platform that allowed users to network with other professionals and manage their online reputation.

In October 2010, Naymz claimed to have 1.8 million members.

As of December 2017, Naymz has been shut down by the owners.

== History ==
Naymz was founded by Nolan Bayliss, Tony Czupryna, and Tom Drugan in January 2006. The three founders previously worked at and met at the online travel company Orbitz in Chicago. Naymz launched to the public in June, 2006.

== Importance ==
Naymz was one of the first Web 2.0 sites to provide utilities for Online Reputation Management (ORM) services. Other sites providing similar services include ClaimID, ReputationDefender, and LinkedIn.

In September 2007, Naymz added social networking to its platform and a proprietary Reputation Scoring system called RepScore.

Naymz has appeared in print and digital news articles in leading media outlets, including USA Today, ABC News, NPR, Wall St. Journal, and Washington Post.
