= Dawn Raid (Malaysia) =

1981 acquisition of Guthrie Corporation by Malaysia's Permodalan Nasional Berhad

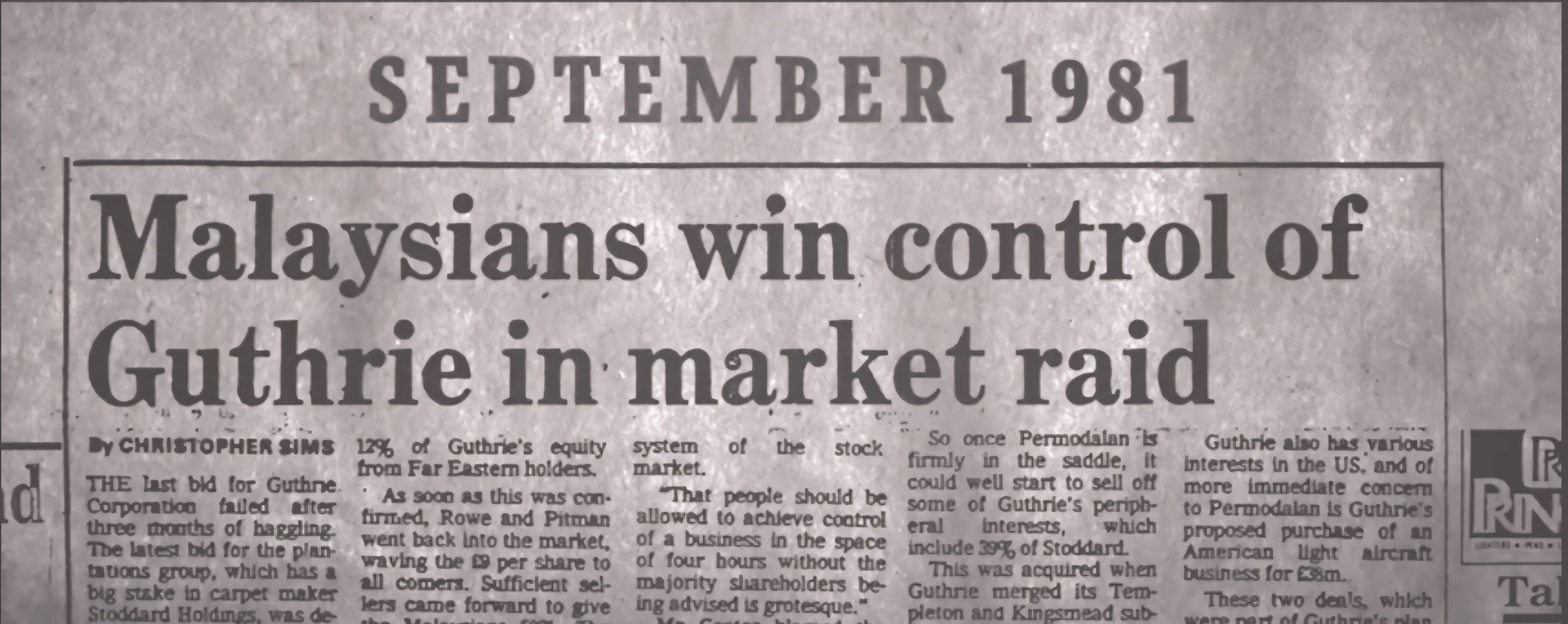
A newspaper headline from September 1981 announcing PNB's acquisition of control of Guthrie Corporation.

The Dawn Raid (Malay: Serangan Subuh) was the acquisition of a controlling interest in the British plantation company Guthrie Corporation Limited (GCL) by Malaysia's Permodalan Nasional Berhad (PNB) on 7 September 1981. PNB, which already held approximately one-quarter of Guthrie's shares, rapidly acquired additional shares through the London market and negotiated block purchases, increasing its holding to more than 50 per cent.

The acquisition formed part of a broader process of Malaysianisation of foreign-owned corporate assets following independence and the introduction of the New Economic Policy (NEP). Guthrie possessed extensive plantation interests in Malaysia and remained under British corporate control after Malayan independence in 1957.

Although popularly portrayed as a sudden acquisition, the 1981 operation followed an earlier attempt by the Malaysian-controlled Sime Darby to acquire Guthrie in 1979. After that bid failed, Sime Darby sold approximately 25 per cent of Guthrie's equity to PNB in December 1980. PNB therefore entered the September 1981 operation already as a major shareholder of Guthrie.

== Background ==
Palm oil plantation owned by Sime Darby

British companies continued to own substantial plantation and commercial interests in Malaysia after independence in 1957. Successive Malaysian governments sought to increase local participation in these businesses while generally avoiding compulsory nationalisation, partly because of concerns that expropriation could damage foreign investment and Malaysia's international commercial reputation.

The New Economic Policy, introduced in 1971, included the restructuring of corporate ownership and an objective of increasing Bumiputera participation in the modern corporate sector. PNB was established in 1978 as one of the principal institutions through which this policy was pursued.

Guthrie was particularly significant because of the scale of its Malaysian plantation holdings. By the beginning of the 1980s, the company controlled approximately 194,000 acres of plantation land in Malaysia.

== Earlier takeover attempt ==
The Dawn Raid was preceded by an attempted takeover of Guthrie by Sime Darby in 1979. Sime Darby accumulated a substantial holding but its takeover attempt ultimately failed. Research by historians Shakila Yacob and Nicholas J. White indicates that Malaysian officials and PNB figures were already interested in gaining control of Guthrie during this period.

Following the failure of the Sime Darby bid, approximately 25 per cent of Guthrie's shares held by Sime Darby were sold to PNB in December 1980. PNB consequently became a major Guthrie shareholder about nine months before the Dawn Raid itself.

Guthrie's management was aware of the possibility of renewed Malaysian attempts to acquire the company. During this period Guthrie also sought to diversify its activities outside Malaysia, partly reducing its dependence on Malaysian plantation assets.

== Planning and financing ==
Planning for the acquisition involved a small group of senior Malaysian officials and executives, including PNB chairman and former Bank Negara governor Ismail Mohamed Ali, PNB executive Abdul Khalid Ibrahim, Finance Minister Tengku Razaleigh Hamzah, economic adviser Raja Mohar Raja Badiozaman, and Prime Minister Mahathir Mohamad. The British merchant bank N M Rothschild & Sons advised the Malaysian side on the transaction.

According to Yacob and White, approximately £282 million was required to purchase the GCL shares. PNB's unit-trust resources were insufficient to meet the funding requirement, and funds were transferred from the state-owned petroleum company Petronas and the state-owned investment corporation PERNAS.

The financing arrangements were deliberately kept confidential. Yacob and White report that the account receiving the funds could not be held in the name of PNB, PETRONAS, PERNAS, Bank Negara Malaysia, the Ministry of Finance or another Malaysian government agency because this could cause the operation to be perceived as government nationalisation rather than a commercial acquisition. An account was consequently established in Switzerland in Khalid Ibrahim's name for purposes connected with the transaction.

Yacob and White describe the use of the Swiss account as part of the effort to present the acquisition as a market transaction rather than government sequestration of British-owned assets.

== Dawn Raid ==
On 7 September 1981, PNB and its advisers began purchasing additional Guthrie shares through London brokers and from institutional and other substantial shareholders whose holdings had been identified beforehand.

PNB entered the operation with a holding of approximately 25 per cent. Purchases on 7 September increased its interest to more than 50 per cent, giving PNB effective control of Guthrie before the company's management could organise an effective response.

The speed with which the final controlling interest was assembled gave the transaction its popular description as a "Dawn Raid". However, the acquisition followed substantial prior preparation, PNB's existing minority holding, the earlier Sime Darby takeover attempt and advance identification of shareholders from whom additional shares could be acquired.

PNB subsequently made an offer for the remaining Guthrie shares, resulting in full Malaysian ownership of the company.

== Immediate outcomes and significance ==
The acquisition transferred control of Guthrie and its substantial Malaysian plantation interests from British to Malaysian corporate ownership. It accelerated the Malaysianisation of major former British plantation enterprises and contributed to the government's corporate-ownership objectives under the NEP.

Historians have interpreted the Dawn Raid within the broader process of post-colonial economic restructuring. Yacob and White describe its origins as part of the "unfinished business" of Malaysian decolonisation, while also emphasising that Malaysian policymakers deliberately pursued acquisition through the market rather than compulsory nationalisation.

The transaction was also commercially significant. Guthrie's Malaysian plantation holdings included land whose development potential became increasingly valuable as Malaysia urbanised. PNB later disposed of a number of Guthrie's non-Malaysian interests; according to Khalid Ibrahim's retrospective account cited by Yacob and White, proceeds from these disposals ultimately exceeded the approximately £282 million acquisition cost.

The favourable subsequent financial outcome contributed to the Dawn Raid's prominent place in Malaysian corporate history. The acquisition nevertheless required financial resources beyond those available through PNB's own unit-trust funds, resulting in the involvement of PETRONAS and PERNAS in financing the transaction.

== Anglo-Malaysian relations ==
The acquisition occurred during a period of deteriorating relations between Malaysia and the United Kingdom. Disputes included the British government's treatment of university fees for overseas students and disagreements concerning commercial and aviation matters.

The Dawn Raid was one episode within these broader tensions. Mahathir's government subsequently introduced the "Buy British Last" policy, under which Malaysian government purchasing was directed away from British suppliers where alternatives were available.

The Dawn Raid has sometimes been associated with subsequent restrictions on rapid share acquisitions in the British market. However, British concern about "dawn raids" predated the Guthrie acquisition. Rules governing substantial acquisitions of shares had already been introduced by the Council for the Securities Industry in December 1980, following earlier market raids, and further regulation was already under discussion before September 1981.

== Subsequent corporate history ==
Guthrie's Malaysian operations subsequently became Kumpulan Guthrie Berhad. In 2007, Kumpulan Guthrie, Golden Hope Plantations and Sime Darby were combined as part of the formation of an enlarged Sime Darby group.

Sime Darby's plantation operations were separately listed as Sime Darby Plantation Berhad in 2017. In 2024, the company was renamed SD Guthrie Berhad, reviving the Guthrie name.

== Cancelled film project ==
In 2025, Malaysian actor and filmmaker Bront Palarae was developing a feature film titled Dawn Raid: The Hands That Rattled The Queen, based on the 1981 acquisition. The project was subsequently cancelled after financing was not secured.
