= Paolo Cirio =

Italian artist (born 1979)

- Born: 1979 (age 46–47); Turin, Italy
- Known for: Contemporary art; conceptual art; performance art; public art; photography; painting; net art; street art; hacktivism

Paolo Cirio (born 1979) is an Italian conceptual artist, hacktivist and cultural critic.

Cirio's work embodies hacker ethics, such as open access, privacy policies, and the critique of economic, legal, and political models. He has proposed improved public policies in such fields through activist campaigns. He has received a number of legal threats for his Internet art performances, which include practices such as hacking, piracy, leaking sensitive information, identity theft, and cyber attacks. Paolo has been awarded the first prize at Ars Electronica in 2014 by the Golden Nica and the Eyebeam Fellowship in 2012, among other recognitions.

Paolo Cirio is known for having exposed over 200,000 Cayman Islands offshore firms with the work Loophole for All in 2013; the hacking of Facebook through publishing 1 million users on a dating website with Face to Facebook in 2011 ; the theft of 60,000 financial news articles with Daily Paywall in 2014 and of e-books from Amazon.com with Amazon Noir in 2006; defrauding Google with GWEI in 2005; and the obfuscation of 15 million U.S. criminal records with Obscurity in 2016; exposing over 20,000 patents of technology enabling social manipulation with Sociality in 2018 . Recently, in 2020, he pirated over 100,000 Sotheby’s auction records in Derivatives and he attempted to profile 4000 French police officers with facial recognition in Capture. His early works include his cyber attacks against NATO and reporting on its military operations since 2001 .

== 2001 - 2004 ==
In 2002, Cirio's first international action was called Anti-NATO Day. As an act of Hacktivism he staged a virtual sit-in (DDoS attack) on the NATO website through a Flash Player script. The Canadian Department of National Defence investigated the action and the Eisenhower Institute used it as a case study to identify future vulnerabilities in space security. Cirio promoted the action through his anti-war web portal called StopTheNato.org, which he launched in August 2001 and updated periodically until 2006.

In 2004, Cirio joined the Illegal Art Show network, which organized street art happenings in Italy in line with the Temporary Autonomous Zone philosophy. They occupied public spaces and invited artists to create and show artworks during the events. Cirio created several street art pieces and organized three such events independently: two in Turin in 2004 and a third in London in 2005.

== 2005 - 2007 ==
In 2005, Cirio hacked Google's AdSense service by creating internet bots for a click fraud in order to buy Google's shares with its own money. In an attempt to stop the project, Google sent a cease and desist letter to the artists mentioning legal consequences for the project. Cirio worked on the project Google Will Eat Itself (GWEI) in conjunction with Alessandro Ludovico and Ubermorgen. The project questioned the information monopoly of Google and its revenue model.

In 2006 he eluded Amazon.com's protections with internet bots exploiting a vulnerability of the "search inside" service. He scraped complete texts of books, reassembled them into PDF files, and redistributed them for free. The company refused to comment on the action. In collaboration with Alessandro Ludovico and Ubermorgen, Cirio created the project Amazon Noir to criticize the abuse of copyright laws for digital content misappropriated by private corporations.

Face to Facebook, Amazon Noir and Google Will Eat Itself together form the Hacking Monopolism Trilogy.

== 2008 - 2010 ==
Between 2008 and 2010, Cirio worked on experimental storytelling, involving actors and audiences to present real facts and issues through fictional stories across multiple media platforms. He called this technique of documentary fiction "Recombinant Fiction." This socially engaged genre of transmedia storytelling has resulted in two projects: Drowning NYC (2010) and The Big Plot (2009).

In 2010, during the Great Recession, Cirio created the piece P2P Gift Credit Card - Gift Finance . Cirio issued thousands of illicit VISA credit cards to design a creative monetary policy, named "Gift Finance", which is a participatory and interest-free basic income guarantee system. In the following years, he presented the projects in relation to the economic recession and the related Occupy Wall Street protests.

== 2011 - 2012 ==
Since 2011, Cirio has been addressing the cultural shift and mainstream media attention toward popular perceptions of privacy and ownership of public and personal information, with the projects Street Ghosts, Persecuting.US, and Face to Facebook. The methodology used to create these artworks was initially formalized in a series called Anti-Social Sculptures.

In 2011, Cirio created Face to Facebook with Alessandro Ludovico. For this piece, Cirio collected one million Facebook profiles, filtered them with artificial intelligence for facial recognition software, and published 250,000 of them onto Lovely-Faces.com, a mock dating website designed by Cirio, with the profiles sorted according to facial expressions. This resulted in eleven lawsuit threats, five death threats, and four legal letters from Facebook . The legal repercussions were integrated into the artwork as a component part of a creative project within an expanded field. Within a few days, the project was covered by over a thousand media outlets from around the world including CNN, Fox News, Tagesschau, and Apple Daily.

With the Street Ghosts project in 2012, Cirio recontextualized photos of individuals found on Google Street View, by printing and posting life-sized pictures of people in the exact locations where they were photographed. The posters were wheatpasted on the walls of public buildings without authorization. These interventions took place in public spaces of several major cities, including London, Berlin, and New York.

In 2012, his web project Persecuting.US profiled the political affiliations of over one million Americans who used Twitter during the months leading up to the 2012 United States presidential election. Cirio appropriated the data and algorithmically determined users’ political affiliations to raise awareness on voter profiling and polarization in social bubbles that can be targeted for political manipulation.

== 2013 - 2014 ==
In 2013, Cirio investigated offshore financial systems with the project Loophole for All . The project made public the list of all the companies registered in the Cayman Islands for the first time, exposing tax evasion practices by counterfeiting Certificate of Incorporation documents signed with his name. This information was published on the website Loophole4All.com, engaging international participation through selling the real identities of anonymous Cayman companies for 99 cents. This provocation elicited reactions from Cayman authorities and global banks as well as legal threats by multinational companies, international law firms, and local Cayman businesses. After three weeks of selling conceptual and subversive artworks in the form of limited editions of firms’ identities, PayPal suspended the account, claiming the sales activity was in violation of PayPal's Acceptable Use Policy. The project offered a creative approach to democratizing and making-known the financial privileges afforded to moneyed individuals and multinational corporations. In 2014 the project won the Golden Nica, first prize of Prix Ars Electronica.

In 2014, Cirio created the Global Direct project, a creative political philosophy that the artist outlined for worldwide participatory democracy within the potentials offered by the Internet. To illustrate the conceptual work, the artist drew a series of fifteen Organizational charts to inspire values and functions for a global and participatory society. The fifteen diagrams of Global Direct were informed by the artist’s research into the social science of ancient, contemporary, and emergent democracy.

In 2014 Cirio created Daily Paywall by hacking the paywall of The Wall Street Journal, Financial Times, and The Economist. Through his paid subscriptions and Scripting language hack, he obtained over 60,000 news articles published during the course of 2014. The pay-per-view content was republished for free on the website DailyPaywall.com and the artist proposed to pay people to read featured financial news articles. Cirio conceived a provocative sharing economy model, where crowdsourcing was put in place to allow and incentivize people to access information on economic matters. Using this system, readers were able to earn money for every quiz about featured news they correctly completed, and journalists were able to claim compensation for their work. Everyone could donate any amount to crowdfund the system. After a few days, the ISP hosting DailyPaywall.com disabled the site after receiving complaints of international Copyright infringement from Pearson PLC, the education and publisher company and owner of the Financial Times and The Economist. Additionally The Wall Street Journal proceeded to terminate the artist’s subscription due to a violation of their Terms of Service. In 2016, Pearson sold both The Economist and the Financial Times and Cirio republished the whole content of DailyPaywall.com. His entire artistic act was pre-scripted as a performance for illustrating critical issues on the Information economy that Cirio outlined within the launch of the project.

== 2015 - 2016 ==
During the spring of 2015, Cirio conducted the street art campaign OVEREXPOSED concerning the aftermath of Edward Snowden’s global surveillance disclosures. He disseminated on public walls unauthorized photos of high-ranking U.S. intelligence officials of the NSA, CIA and FBI, who were accountable for political measures or advocacy for mass surveillance and espionage programs. The photos, mostly selfies from Facebook and Twitter accounts of civilians, were rendered with a particular technique called High Definition Stencils invented by the artist for the street art campaign that took place in NYC, London, Berlin and Paris between April and May 2015. The intervention generated media coverage and public interest internationally and particularly in Germany in connection to the German Parliamentary Committee investigating the NSA spying scandal.

In 2016, Cirio created the project Obscurity in which he obfuscated over 10 million online mugshots and the criminal records of victims of mass incarceration in United States. The project addressed the unregulated mug shot publishing industry that anonymous internet companies exploit in order to shame and blackmail people who have been arrested in the U.S. regardless of their charges and trial verdicts. Cirio targeted six mugshot websites and blurred millions of mugshots and shuffled names listed. In response he received support from mugshot extortion victims and was subject to a legal threat from Mugshots.com, an anonymous firm in Nevis, and US Data ltd., a Texan firm owning a few mugshot websites. With Obscurity, Cirio questioned the Right to Be Forgotten law, which has been opposed by major search engine companies in the U.S. Ultimately, to point out the accountability of search engines in exposing personal sensitive information, Cirio designed the campaign Right2Remove.us to introduce a privacy policy adapting the Right to Be Forgotten law to the United States. With the Right to Remove policy, Cirio suggested types of sensitive personal data that should be removed from online search results to protect specific categories of vulnerable individuals. The campaign formed a community of activists for the removal of online criminal records and a form of Right to be Forgotten in United States.

== 2017 - 2018 ==
During 2017, Cirio curated the Evidentiary Realism exhibitions in NYC and Berlin art galleries featuring artists engaged in investigative, forensic, and documentary art. He articulated a particular form of realism in art that portrays and reveals evidence through investigation and research-based work. The exhibitions included historical artists such as Hans Haacke, Mark Lombardi, Jenny Holzer, and Harun Farocki. A collection of essays about the works presented were published in the book Evidentiary Realism.

In 2018, Cirio published the project Sociality with over 20000 patents of algorithms, devices, and interfaces of social media, online advertising, and other Internet technologies, that he collected from Google Patents. He then rated the patents by which ones were potentially the most socially harmful. A selection of patents ordered by categories such as discrimination, polarization, addiction, deception, control, censorship, and surveillance were published in The Coloring Book of Technology for Social Manipulation. On the project’s website, visitors are invited to share, flag, and ban these patents. Furthermore, as a form of protest, Cirio posted printed patent titles and images at the main universities in the U.S. such as at Harvard, MIT, Stanford, Berkeley, and Columbia. This project responded to the scandals of Cambridge Analytica and Youtube algorithms that broke in 2018 and broadly it traces the history of the Internet with the advent of targeted advertising, corporate surveillance, and information feed filtered by artificial intelligence.

== 2019 - 2020 ==
In the spring of 2019 with his work Foundations he theorized an aesthetics of contemporary social complexity and the use of flowcharts as an artistic medium for seeing and engaging with such aesthetics. He published a monograph of his artworks using flowcharts to work with socio-economic information systems and a separate text book for the project Foundations where he curated a selection of artworks, exhibitions, and publications from the history of conceptual art to identify an ontology of an aesthetics of social complexity.

During the fall of 2019, Cirio presented three new projects related to his concept of Internet Photography focusing on the economic and legal aspects of images circulating online. Rather than addressing privacy, with these projects Cirio looked at the relations between cultural and economic values of online photos. In particular with the artwork Attention, Cirio addressed subtle forms advertising by Instagram influencers. Cirio collected hundreds of photos by online influencers promoting controversial products without disclaimers and highlighted their photographic language in a series of artworks. Furthermore, in partnership with the University of Maastricht he researched the legal implications of moderating and regulating such subtle advertising and advocating for regulating it.

In June 2020, Cirio launched the project Derivatives online, with a database of over 100,000 Sotheby’s auction records he assembled over several years. Cirio overlaid the auction prices on the images to sell them as digital artworks on the website Art-Derivatives.com for a fraction of the value set at the auctions. Cirio designed a "future" financial derivative contract for the sale of his derivative works. By betting against future prices of derivative works, with Cirio’s concept everyone can ironically participate in the financialization of art. In addition, the project campaigns for enacting more transparency and fairness in the art market. In order to induce regulation, Cirio has investigated secrecy and manipulation of art auctions through extensive research . This project was reported by the international outlets as a controversial and investigative work.

In October 2020, Cirio created the project Capture with 4000 faces of French police officers assembled by a facial recognition system. Further, Cirio aimed to crowdsource the identification of the officers on his platform Capture-Police.com. In response the interior minister Gérald Darmanin and police unions forced the take down of the project both online and at the exhibition in the French art institution Le Fresnoy. This case of censorship of Cirio’s work was largely reported internationally. This provocation was designed by Cirio to promote his campaign #BanFacialRecognitionEU. In 2021, Cirio concluded the campaign to ban facial recognition technology in Europe by delivering his legal research and complaint to the European Commission and EDPS with over 50,000 signatures supporting his petition.

== 2021 - 2023 ==
On October 9, 2021, Cirio established the first international climate crime tribunal though a solo exhibition at the historical museum of Certosa di San Giacomo in Capri. His concept of Climate Tribunal combines a body of works about Climate Justice from a legal and economic standpoint. Cirio gathered data, graphs, and images as evidence to hold major oil, gas, and coal companies responsible for their greenhouse gas emissions. The historical scientific, legal, and economic evidence is presented by Cirio through fine artworks, online platforms, public events, and interviews with experts.

Cirio’s Climate Tribunal integrates the science of the attribution of recent climate change with the legal concept of environmental personhood, and the rights of nature jurisprudential theory, informed by climate change litigation, ecocide bills, and global climate treaties. Central to Cirio’s concept is the historical study Carbon Majors Database by the Climate Accountability Institute, the first to establish precise responsibilities for each international fossil fuel firm , and deduced that the major 100 oil, gas and coal producers have generated over 70% of greenhouse gas emissions.

For Dutch Design Week 2021, Cirio launched the project Extinction Claims addressing ongoing Mass Extinction. On Extinction-Claims.com Cirio aggregated data on 40,000 vulnerable species and the public can claim financial compensation from major fossil fuel companies on behalf of endangered species through an algorithm that Cirio made to calculate funding for the preservation of endangered species whose natural environments are threatened by climate change. Extinction Claims was part of a larger campaign for the introduction of a Carbon Tax dedicated to the preservation of ecosystems vulnerable to climate change.

Between 2022 and 2023, Cirio received three grants to expand the conceptual framework of the Climate Tribunal, from Strasbourg University, New York University Tandon School of Engineering, and Hamburg University. Through these commissions, Cirio created platforms to engage online users with the Carbon Majors Database and Climate Justice, including the projects Flooding-NYC-Claims.net and Footprint-Justice.com . In January 2023, Cirio launched the Climate Class Action, a campaign aimed at promoting lawsuits that would enable all citizens to seek compensation for personal damages caused by climate change. Cirio created the platform ClimateClassAction.com , where everyone can calculate monetary compensation based on the emissions of major fossil fuel companies.

In 2024, as a result of his research on climate change, Cirio published the book Climate Tribunal, which includes philosophical reflections, resources on climate litigation, and political-economic evidence against the fossil fuel industry. In this book, Cirio assembled a timeline with 100 historical evidence of the accountability of the fossil fuel industry .
