= Joe Fuca =

American businessman

- Education: California Lutheran University
- Occupations: CEO of Reputation.com, former President of FinancialForce

Joe Fuca is an American businessman, best known as the current CEO of Reputation.com and a former executive at DocuSign and FinancialForce. Prior to his CEO role, he previously spent more than 30 years in technology and Software-as-a-Service growth companies.

== Early life and education ==
Fuca grew up in Southern California and attended Crespi Carmelite High School in Encino.

He was awarded a football scholarship to California Lutheran University, where he is the program's third-leading all-time receiver by total yardage. He also played college baseball and basketball. He received a Bachelor's in both Business Administration and Communications Arts. While in college he served the head coach of a Thousand Oaks High School basketball team.

== Career ==
Fuca has more than 30 years experience in technology growth companies. Fuca served in management roles at Evolve Software and PeopleSoft. Fuca later spent years as a senior executive at each of MarketLive (2004-2008) and McAffee (2008-2011).

In 2011, Fuca joined DocuSign as senior vice president of worldwide sales. During his tenure, revenue grew from $25 million to $250 million annually.

In 2016, Fuca entered the role of president of field operations at FinancialForce. Fuca served during a period of growth and increasing margins.

Fuca currently serves vice Executive of Schools for Valley Christian Schools in Dublin, CA. Prior to that Fuca served as CEO of Reputation.com until 2023 and he remains on the Board of Directors. He succeeded founder Michael Fertik, who served as interim CEO and returned to his role as executive chairman. Ted Schlein, general partner at Kleiner Perkins Caufield & Byers noted that KPCB has now invested in two companies led by Fuca.

== Community ==
In 2003, Fuca founded the San Francisco Bay Area AAU basketball team "Lakeshow." He describes the goal of the program as to "get our kids exposure and put them in a college setting so they can be seen by college coaches" in order to receive college scholarship opportunities. Lakeshow alumni currently playing professional basketball include Mark Tollefsen.
