= Wanted poster =

Poster describing a fugitive

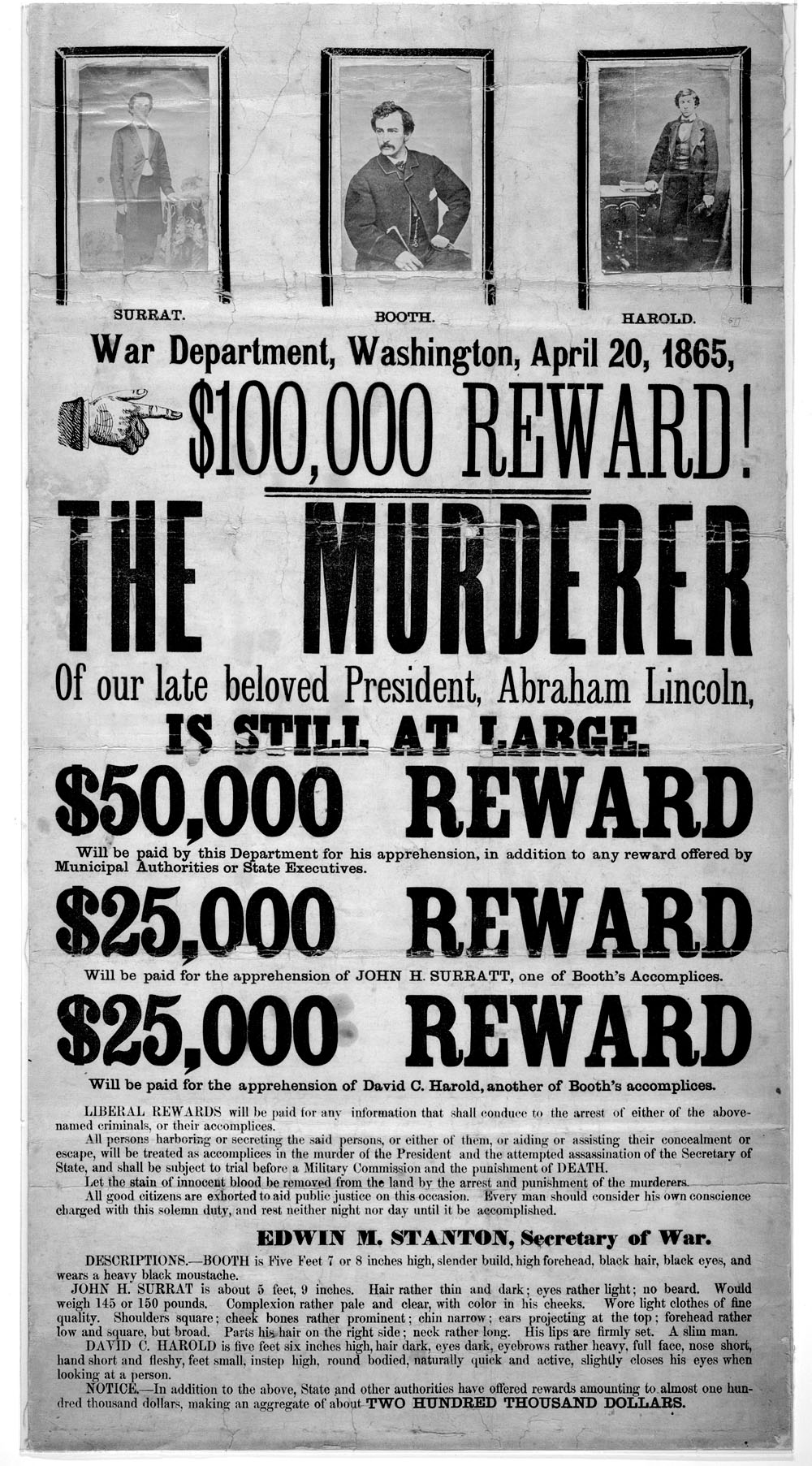
Wanted poster for John Wilkes Booth and his accomplices in the assassination of Abraham Lincoln

A wanted poster (or wanted sign) is a poster distributed to let the public know of a person whom authorities wish to apprehend. They generally include a picture of the person, either a photograph when one is available or of a facial composite image produced by police.

== Description ==
Wanted posters typically include an image or description of a fugitive or alleged criminal and a description of the crime for which they are sought. There is typically a set monetary reward offered to whoever catches the wanted criminal that is advertised on the poster. Wanted posters are typically produced to be displayed in public locations such as post offices, district offices, and other venues. Modern wanted posters are also typically published on the Internet. In popular culture, wanted posters are often associated with the American frontier and the wood type that was used on posters of the time. Wanted posters have historically been printed without color, with the FBI not using color photographs in their printed posters until 2009.

=== Electronic billboards ===
In 2007, the FBI began posting wanted posters on electronic billboards starting with 23 cities, and have been working to expand this system in other states. This allows them to instantly post a wanted notice in public view across the US. In 2014, the FBI claimed that at least 53 cases had been solved as a direct result of digital billboard publicity, and many others had been solved through the Bureau's overall publicity efforts that included the billboards. In 2014, the FBI claimed to have access to over 5,200 billboards across the United States.

== Bounty ==
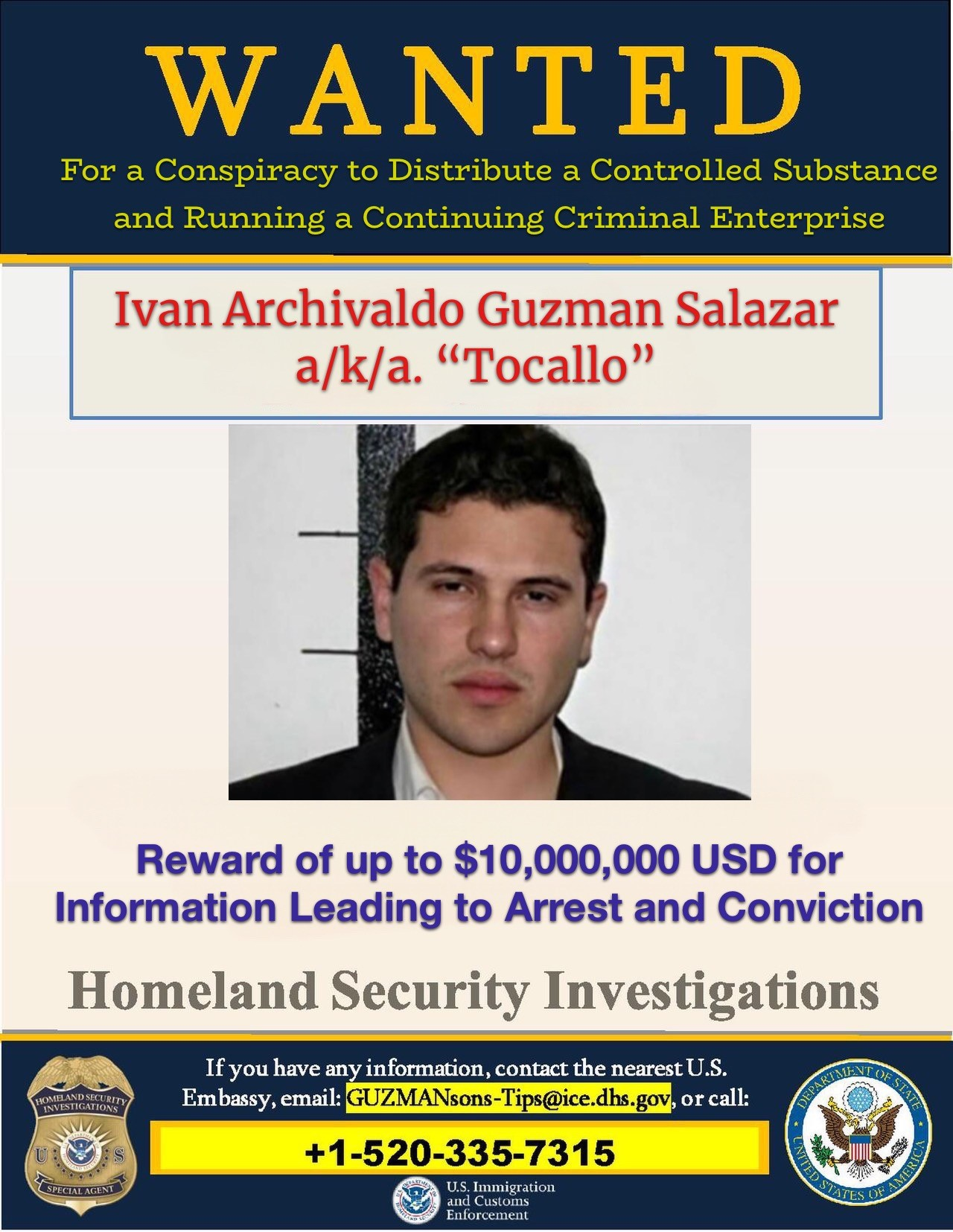
Wanted poster for El Chapito for $10 million USD

Wanted posters for particularly notorious fugitives frequently offer a bounty for the capture of the person, or for a person who can provide information leading to such capture. Bounties provided an incentive for citizens to aid law enforcement, either by providing information, or by catching the criminal themselves. More modern wanted posters may also include images of the fugitive's fingerprints. People who, as a profession, chase wanted individuals with the intent to collect their bounties are referred to as bounty hunters.

Historically, some wanted posters offering a reward contained the phrase "dead or alive". Thus, one would get a reward for either bringing the person or their corpse to the authorities. This could indicate that the person was an outlaw, and that it was permissible to kill them. Alternatively, the phrase might mean that it was permissible to kill them if they resisted arrest. While most issuers of wanted posters instead preferred the target to be taken alive in order to stand trial, some private organizations were willing to go to these extreme measures to protect their interests.

== In the media ==
Wanted posters have been used by media sources to cast prominent figures as wild west criminals. Popular examples of this include the September 4, 1939 edition of the British newspaper the Daily Mirror, which cast Adolf Hitler as a "reckless criminal" "wanted dead or alive". This idea was also used by the New York Post in their global search for Osama bin Laden in 2001, shortly after President George W. Bush made the reference, "And there's an old poster out West, that I recall, that said, 'Wanted: Dead or Alive'."

== See also ==
- All-points bulletin
- Most wanted list
- Mug shot
- Mug shot publishing industry
- Pittura infamante
