= Gnolia =

Defunct social bookmarking website

Magnolia
- Website type: Online social bookmarking
- Owner: Gnolia Systems
- Website: http://gnolia.com
- Registration: Optional
- Launched: 2006
- Current status: Defunct

Gnolia, named Ma.gnolia until 2009, was a social bookmarking web site with an emphasis on design, social features, and open standards. In January 2009, Gnolia lost members' bookmarks in a widely reported data loss incident. It relaunched as a smaller service several months later and was ultimately shut down at the end of 2010.

Users could rate bookmarks and mark bookmarks as private. Unlike its main competitor Delicious, Ma.gnolia stored snapshots of bookmarked web pages. One feature that distinguished it from other similar web sites was the group feature, which allowed several users to share a common collection of bookmarks, managed by a selected number of group managers.

The design of the web site allowed for integration of the service into other applications via both a REST API and an API similar to the Delicious API.

== Open standards ==
Ma.gnolia supported open standards and was often among early adopters of these standards. The bookmarking service provided support for several Microformats: In July and August 2006, among other information, support for MicroID and XFN was announced on the Ma.gnolia blog. The announcements were well received by the community around online reputation management services.

In December 2007, Ma.gnolia collaborated with Engagd to let users build attention profiles from their bookmarks. In March 2008, Ma.gnolia changed its join and sign-in pages to require users to sign up with a verified identity using OpenID. In August 2008, Ma.gnolia, among others, signed the OAuth 1.0 license.

== M2 project ==
In August 2008, founder Larry Halff announced a ground-up rewrite of the service called M2. Parts of the new version were going to be provided under an open source license. It was planned that custom installations of Ma.gnolia can be federated with other installations or the Ma.gnolia website itself. This distributed aspect was the main difference from a similar project by Reddit.

== January 2009 total data loss ==
Ma.gnolia servers lost all data in a complete outage on January 30, 2009. On February 17, Halff announced that due to data corruption, all user data in the database was irretrievable, rendering the site essentially dead.

Ma.gnolia's Recovery Tools allowed users to recover some data from web caches and from other feeds. However, since the tools rely on external sources to reconstruct users' data, they were limited in how much data they could restore.

== Relaunch and shutdown ==
Halff relaunched Ma.gnolia in September 2009 with basically the same software but as a small, invitation-only service. After a request from Magnolia (CMS), it changed its name to Gnolia in October 2009.

In September 2010, Halff announced that he was shutting down Gnolia as of September 29, 2010. "Gnolia will go into read-only mode in a week on September 29, 2010. It will then remain available for bookmark exporting until at least November 30, 2010."
