= Michael Fertik =

American internet entrepreneur and privacy advocate

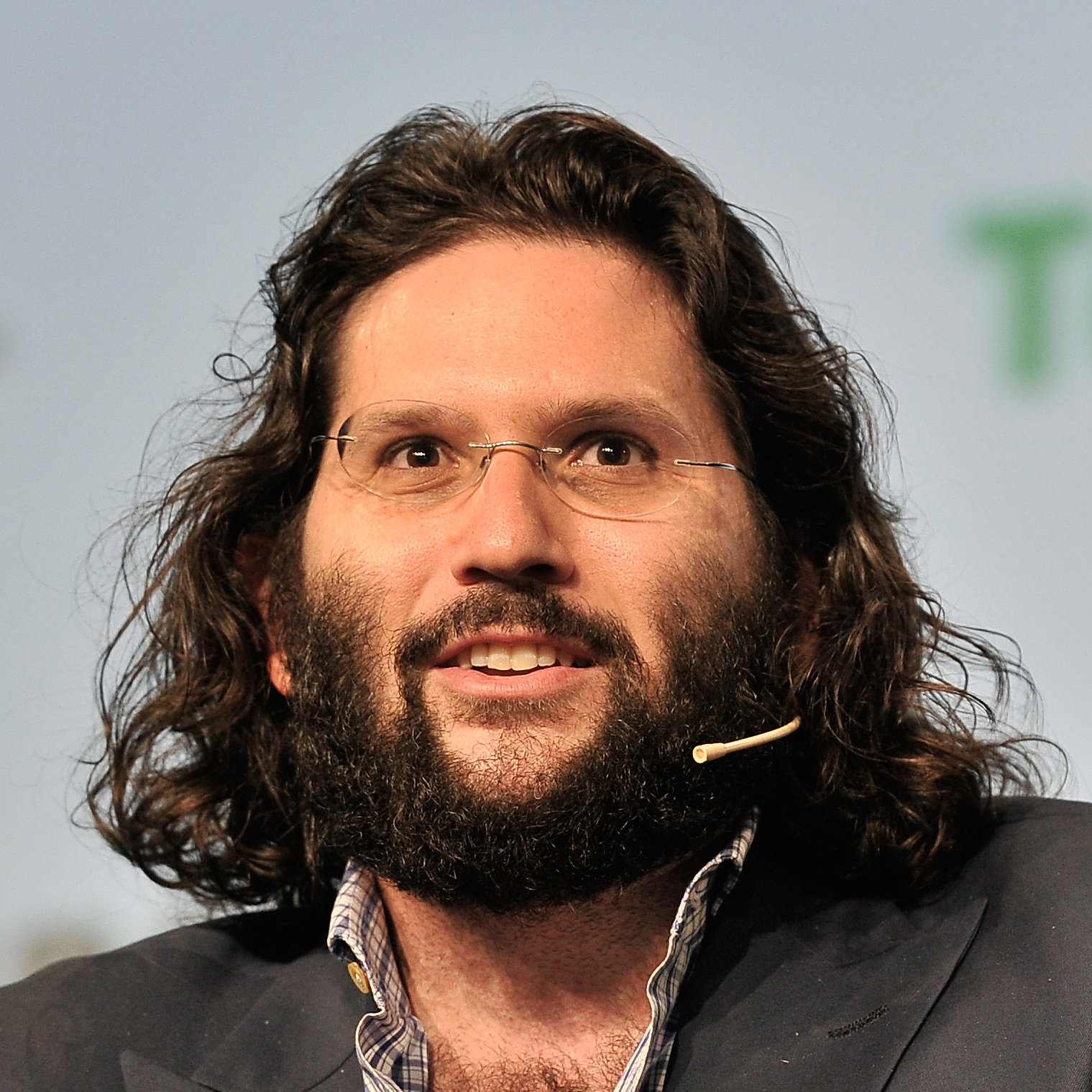
- Fertik in 2017
- Born: October 1, 1978 (age 48); New York City, U.S.
- Education: Harvard College, (B.A., 2000), Harvard Law School, J.D., 2005
- Occupations: Founder & Chief Executive Officer of Reputation.com
- Known for: Creating the field of Online reputation management

Michael Fertik (born October 1, 1978) is an American internet entrepreneur and privacy advocate known for pioneering the industry of online reputation management. He is the founder, current executive chairman, owner and former CEO of Reputation.com, Inc. a Redwood City technology company that sends take-down requests to websites hosting embarrassing content, attempts to influence search results, and help clients obtain positive reviews. He advocates that the internet be cautious to respect the privacy and reputations of people and businesses.

== Career ==
Fertik earned a degree from Harvard Law School. While earning his undergraduate, he co-founded and sold a software company called TruExchange. After he graduated, he served as a clerk for the Sixth Circuit of the United States Court of Appeals. During his position with the court, he was reading media stories about cyber-bullying and the effect it had on people's lives in the real world. According to Fertik, "I noticed something about the Internet that really bothered me: Anyone could say anything about anybody with impunity. Right or wrong, true or false, outdated or misleading — it didn’t matter." He turned down a job offer he had in Washington and moved to Silicon Valley to start Reputation.com (formerly ReputationDefender) in 2006.

Initially ReputationDefender was offering services for online reputation management and suppression of negative content, but later the ReputationDefender brand was sold off and the remaining company became known as just Reputation.com, and turned into a software-as-a-service platform. Reputation.com raised $67 million in venture capital. Originally it was intended for parents that wanted to protect their children's online reputation, but it ended up being professionals that were primarily interested in the service. As social media became more prevalent, it introduced more features for it. Fertik became known for pioneering the field of online reputation management. According to Forbes he "more or less invented the sector of online reputation management." He was named "Entrepreneur of the Year" by TechAmerica in 2010 and became a regular commenter on internet privacy issues in national broadcast media. In 2010 Fertik co-authored a book with David Thompson entitled "Wild West 2.0: How to Protect and Restore Your Online Reputation on the Untamed Social Frontier".

Fertik is on the Global Agenda Council on Internet Security for the World Economic Forum. He also blogs for the Harvard Business Review, and maintains a guest column for Inc. Magazine. Fertik also participates in and provides direction for various advocacy programs. He sits on the Advisory Boards of the Internet Keepsafe Coalition (iKeepSafe) and the Future of Privacy Forum.

In 2017, Fertik participated in the mockumentary Bubbleproof from Femto Films.

== Views ==
Fertik is an advocate for respecting an individual's online privacy. He advocates for either regulation of the internet or raising awareness. Critics of Fertik's business say that it inhibits free speech or allows wealthy individuals to manipulate search results and marginalize their critics. Over time, the public's views on privacy have grown more aligned with Fertik's perspective. In an interview with The New York Times, Fertik said that companies should not manufacture fake reviews, because it is "inherently sleazy" and illegal. Instead, business can generate legitimate positive reviews from actual customers. He also advises that companies should respond to negative comment calmly. Regarding Twitter, he stated that "For all its trendiness, social media is often a waste of their time."
