= Reputation.com =

Online reputation management company

Reputation
- Type: Private
- Industry: Online reputation management, digital marketing
- Founded: 2006
- Founders: Michael Fertik
- Headquarters: Redwood City, California, U.S.
- Key people: Joe Burton, CEO
- Number of employees: 490
- Website: reputation.com

Reputation (formally Reputation.com and ReputationDefender) is a business-to-business online reputation management and customer experience management company headquartered in San Ramon, California. The company claims its software-as-a-service platform helps businesses monitor and respond to online reviews, social media, and surveys; analyze customer sentiment; and collaborate to make operational improvements.

== History ==
Reputation.com was founded as ReputationDefender by Michael Fertik in 2006. In January 2011, the company changed its name from ReputationDefender to Reputation.com as its focus changed to enterprise services. The business-to-consumer product line continued to be sold under the ReputationDefender name. In 2018, the business-to-consumer subsidiary was sold, along with related assets and liabilities. Joe Fuca, former DocuSign vice president and FinancialForce president, was named as CEO in August 2018.

In 2018 the company sold the ReputationDefender business line and related assets and liabilities to the Stagwell Group. The sale included all consumer-related businesses, including its privacy- and reputation-related services for individuals. ReputationDefender was acquired by Norton in 2021.

After the sale of ReputationDefender in 2018, Reputation.com has reestablished itself as a software-as-a-service provider.

In March 2020, Reputation.com announced the appointment of Rebecca Biestman as the company's new CMO.

In October 2023, Reputation.com announced the appointment of Joe Burton as Chief Executive Officer.

== ReputationDefender and early services ==
Under the brand ReputationDefender and up until 2018, the company offered online reputation management services, which according to author Lori Andrews charges clients to remove items about them from the Internet with "no guarantee of success." Early cases where the company sought to remove photographs from the Internet, for example, removed about two thirds of the copies from the web, but could not remove the remainder. Websites like Spokeo were compensated for individuals they direct towards ReputationDefender who become ReputationDefender clients. Fatrik (the founder of ReputationDefender) had stated that this arrangement put Spokeo in a position that was capable of profiting from adding negative material about those with profiles on their site. The company often contacted the operators of websites hosting negative content about the client, asking them to remove the information. According to The Wall Street Journal, the letters "don't make threats... but instead try to appeal to recipients' sense of fairness." ReputationDefender charged for increases in the severity of the language used. It generally could remove newspapers or court records.

The company initially charged about fifteen dollars per client, and has asked for at least $1,000 a year for its services. In 2007, it introduced a $10,000 service for executives. Some of the company's software included scoring systems used to identify consumer information and generate reputation scores for individuals. It had software that located websites where an individual's personal data was unknowingly listed and attempted to get it delisted. It can also tracked online reviews and contacted customers to solicit for positive reviews, but could also hide legitimate criticisms about a company, which the Fatrik had stated is a legitimate criticism of its business model. The company served industries including healthcare, retail, automotive, restaurants, and property management. Significant publicly disclosed clients include Banner Health, BMW, Ford Motor Company, Hertz, General Motors, Sutter Health, US Bank and as of 2017 had approximately 750 other enterprise customers in 77 industry verticals.

== Reception ==
In 2012, BusinessWeek noted that "Reputation.com scam" was an autocompleted phrase when typing the company's name into the Google search engine and that many unfavorable search results were hidden on the second page of search results for the keyword "Reputation.com". The autocompleted phrase is a tactic for Reputation.com to hide any reviews about the company that label it a scam, even if legitimate.

According to The New York Times, Reputation.com is popular, but controversial, due to its efforts to remove negative information that may be of public interest. According to Susan Crawford, a cyberlaw specialist from Cardozo Law School, most websites will remove negative content when contacted to avoid litigation. The Wall Street Journal noted that in some cases, writing a letter to a detractor can have unintended consequences, though the company makes an effort to avoid writing to certain website operators that are likely to respond negatively. The company's CEO says it respects the First Amendment and does not try to remove "genuinely newsworthy speech." It generally cannot remove major news stories from established publications or court records.

In 2008, former AutoAdmit administrator Anthony Ciolli filed a lawsuit against Reputation.com, among other defendants. The suit was in response to a lawsuit brought against Ciolli by two Yale Law School students for being defamed on the Internet message board, which is a forum for current and prospective law school students. Ciolli claims to have lost a job offer as a result of negative publicity from the original suit.

In a 2009 paper in the Harvard Journal of Law & Gender, law professor Ann Bartow said Reputation.com exploited the harassment of women on the Internet for media attention.

Two months after the company was founded, ReputationDefender was hired to remove online images of 18-year-old Nikki Catsouras's lethal car accident, which police said was leaked by an officer. The company was able to get the images taken down on about 300 out of 400 websites. The New York Post said their effort was "surprisingly effective" but raised concerns that its polite letters were resulting in censorship of material offensive to their clients. Newsweek said it was ineffective. ReputationDefender said removing the images was an "unwinnable battle".
