= Nikki Catsouras photographs controversy =

Leaked photograph controversy

Nicole Ellis "Nikki" Catsouras (née Mayo; March 4, 1988 – October 31, 2006) died at age 18 in a high-speed car crash in Lake Forest, California. She lost control of her father’s Porsche 911 Carrera and collided with a tollbooth. Photographs of Catsouras’s severely disfigured body were subsequently published online, causing significant distress to her family, who took legal action.

== Background ==
=== Circumstances of the accident ===
On October 31, 2006, Catsouras and her parents ate lunch together at the family home in Ladera Ranch, California. Afterward, her father, Christos Catsouras, left for work while her mother, Lesli, remained at home. About 10 minutes later, Lesli saw Catsouras backing out of the driveway in Christos's Porsche 911 Carrera, which she was not permitted to drive. Lesli called her husband, who began driving around in an attempt to find his daughter. While doing so, he called 9-1-1, apparently only minutes before the crash, and was placed on hold. When the dispatcher returned to the call, he informed Christos that an accident had occurred.

=== Accident ===
At approximately 1:38 p.m., Catsouras was traveling on the 241 Toll Road in Lake Forest when she attempted to pass a Honda Civic on the right at more than 100 miles per hour (160 km/h) and clipped the vehicle. The Porsche crossed the road's broad median, which lacked a physical barrier on that segment, and crashed into an unmanned concrete tollbooth near the Alton Parkway single-point urban interchange. Catsouras was killed instantly by decapitation. Toxicological tests detected traces of cocaine in her body, but no alcohol.

Catsouras was later buried at Pacific View Memorial Park in the Corona del Mar neighborhood of Newport Beach, in Orange County, California.

=== Leaked photographs ===
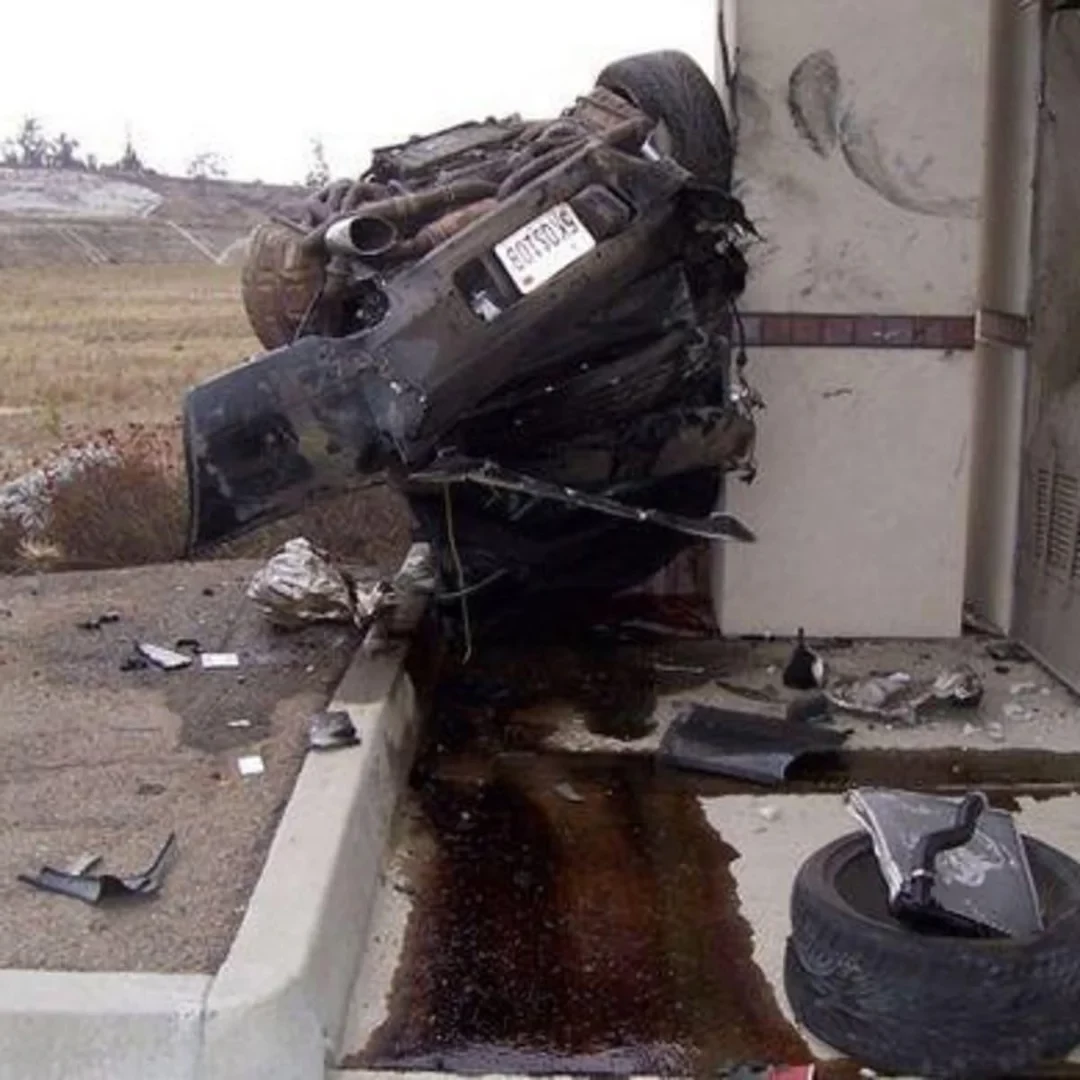
One of the photographs leaked by Reich and O'Donnell

According to Newsweek, the crash was so gruesome that the coroner would not allow Catsouras's parents to identify their daughter's body. California Highway Patrol (CHP) officers took photographs of the scene as part of standard procedures for fatal traffic collisions. The photographs were subsequently shared with other CHP employees and leaked onto the Internet.

Two CHP employees, Aaron Reich and Thomas O'Donnell, admitted to releasing the photographs in violation of CHP policy. O'Donnell stated in interviews that he had sent the photographs to his personal email account to view them later, while Reich said that he had forwarded the photographs to four other people. Catsouras's parents discovered that the photographs had been posted online. The images attracted widespread attention, including through a fake MySpace tribute page containing links to them. People also anonymously emailed copies of the photographs to the Catsouras family with misleading subject lines. In one instance, a photograph sent to her father was captioned, "Woohoo Daddy! Hey daddy, I'm still alive." The harassment prompted the Catsouras family to withdraw from Internet use. Concerned that their younger daughter might be taunted with the photographs, they also began homeschooling her.

The online harassment surrounding the case was featured by Werner Herzog in his 2016 documentary Lo and Behold, Reveries of the Connected World.

== Legal action by the family ==
The Catsouras family sued the California Highway Patrol (CHP) and the two dispatch supervisors responsible for leaking the photographs in the Superior Court of California for Orange County. Initially, a judge ruled that the family's lawsuit against the CHP over the leaked photographs could proceed.

An internal investigation led the CHP to issue a formal apology and take steps to prevent similar incidents after determining that the two dispatch supervisors had violated departmental policy. O'Donnell was suspended for 25 days without pay, while Reich resigned shortly afterward for unrelated reasons, according to his attorney. After the defendants moved for summary judgment, Judge Steven L. Perk dismissed the case against the California Highway Patrol after Reich and O'Donnell were removed as defendants. Judge Perk ruled that the two men had no legal responsibility for protecting the Catsouras family's privacy, effectively ending the basis of the lawsuit. In March 2008, the superior court judge who dismissed the case ruled that although the dispatchers' conduct was "utterly reprehensible", no law allowed them to be held liable for it.

The CHP sent websites "cease and desist" notices in an effort to have the photographs removed from the Internet. The Catsouras family hired ReputationDefender to help remove the photographs, with limited success. The organization estimated that it had persuaded websites to remove approximately 2,500 copies of the photographs but acknowledged that completely removing them from the Internet would be impossible. Attorney and blogger Ted Frank wrote that although the media were sympathetic to the parents' situation, "the Streisand effect has resulted in far more dissemination of the gruesome photos".

On February 1, 2010, it was reported that the California Court of Appeal for the Fourth District had reversed Judge Perk's grant of summary judgment and ruled that the Catsouras family could sue the defendants for negligence and intentional infliction of emotional distress. Describing the actions of O'Donnell and Reich as "vulgar" and "morally deficient", the court stated:

We rely upon the CHP to protect and serve the public. It is antithetical to that expectation for the CHP to inflict harm upon us by making the ravaged remains of our loved ones the subject of Internet sensationalism ... O'Donnell and Reich owed the plaintiffs a duty not to exploit CHP-acquired evidence in such a manner as to place them at foreseeable risk of grave emotional distress.

On May 25, 2011, the California Court of Appeal for the Fourth District ruled that Aaron Reich had failed to show that emailing the photographs was protected by the First Amendment. Reich claimed that he had emailed the photographs as a warning about the dangers of drunk driving, despite Catsouras's postmortem examination showing a blood alcohol content of zero. The three-justice panel that reviewed Reich's appeal wrote, "Any editorial comments that Reich may have made with respect to the photographs are not before us. In short, there is no evidence at this point that the e-mails were sent to communicate on the topic of drunk driving." The justices also questioned whether the recipients still retained the emails, but Reich's attorney acknowledged that they had not investigated the matter.

On January 30, 2012, the CHP reached a settlement with the Catsouras family under which the family received approximately $2.37 million in damages. CHP spokeswoman Fran Clader said: "No amount of money can compensate for the pain the Catsouras family has suffered. We have reached a resolution with the family to save substantial costs of continued litigation and a jury trial. It is our hope that with this legal issue resolved, the Catsouras family can receive some closure."

As of 2021, the Catsouras family was living in an undisclosed location in California because of continued trolling, harassment, and death threats following the lawsuit.

== See also ==
- Suicide of Ronnie McNutt
- Murders of Bibaa Henry and Nicole Smallman
- Streisand effect
