= Wikiturfing =

Reputation management technique

Wikiturfing is a portmanteau of astroturfing and Wikipedia, also called wikiwashing as a portmanteau of Wikipedia and whitewashing. The term refers to an unethical reputation management technique employing Wikipedia to shape opinion. It has been labeled as "unethical and abusive"; an exploitative practice of an "extractive sharing economy", and a disinformation technique.

According to Mayo Fuster Morell, a scholar of the sharing economy,

Wikiwashing refers to a set of actions developed by corporations that first and foremost offer services for information sharing and collaboration online in order to build, promote or direct attention towards an image of themselves connoted with the positive values associated with sharing and collaboration among peers (their users) or to associate its image with that of non-corporate entities such as Wikipedia or wiki technology in general; secondly, it refers to concealing or limiting access to its role as a commercial service and infrastructure provider—such as conditions of use, sharing data with governments, profit-making—in order to perform unethical and abusive practices in these areas. ... replacing workers with volunteers that would likely be regarded as unethical by the communities of users of the infrastructure – if they would know about it...

— M.F. Morell

Another scholar, in the context of protest in modern China, writes:

The ease with which the internet permits users to fashion virtual identities has given rise to a host of collective disinformation strategies, including "astroturfing" (efforts by a small group of activists or actors to convey the impression that a particular agenda is supported by a grassroots movement), "sock-puppeting" (the activation of multiple separate user accounts by an existing registered member of a virtual community) and, even, "wikiturfing" (the practice of posting a Wikipedia entry for a particular organization, catch-phrase, or activity to suggest that it has already attained a level of broad recognition).

— P.M. Thornton

Legal scholar Jim Chen noted the irony of the term "wikiturfing" being itself deleted from Wikipedia in 2006, stating "If Wikipedia dumps this piece of wikiturfing, as appears likely from the Wikipedia community's discussion of this entry, the last redoubt of wikiturfing (the term, not the practice) will be Wikidumper.Org."

Investigative journalists have created a web application, WikiWash, to track potential wikiwashing activities.

== See also ==
- Internet Water Army (China nonstate actor)
- State-sponsored Internet propaganda
