= Lo and Behold, Reveries of the Connected World =

- Theatrical release poster
- Directed by: Werner Herzog
- Written by: Werner Herzog
- Produced by: Rupert Maconick; Werner Herzog
- Narrated by: Werner Herzog
- Cinematography: Peter Zeitlinger
- Edited by: Marco Capalbo
- Music by: Mark Degli Antoni; Sebastian Steinberg
- Production companies: NetScout; Pereira & O'Dell Entertainment; Saville Productions; Skellig Rock
- Distributed by: Magnolia Pictures
- Release date: January 23, 2016 (Sundance)
- Running time: 98 minutes
- Country: United States
- Language: English

Lo and Behold, Reveries of the Connected World is a 2016 American documentary film directed by Werner Herzog. In it, Herzog ponders the existential impact of such things as the Internet, robotics, artificial intelligence, and the Internet of things on modern human life. The leaders in the field of technology who are interviewed in the film include Leonard Kleinrock, Bob Kahn, Ted Nelson, Sebastian Thrun, Kevin Mitnick, and Elon Musk. The film, which was sponsored by the company NetScout, premiered at the 2016 Sundance Film Festival.

== Synopsis ==
Beginning his journey at the University of California, Los Angeles, where pioneering work on the development of the Internet took place, Herzog visits the first piece of Internet equipment ever to be installed. The film then explores some of the positive and negative impacts the Internet has had on society. In a chapter titled "The Dark Side", Herzog interviews the Catsouras family, who have been harassed online since pictures depicting their daughter's corpse were leaked onto the internet.

As no wireless transmissions are allowed within a 10-mile radius around the Green Bank Telescope in West Virginia, Herzog travels there to interview the local residents. He finds a group of people afflicted by an electromagnetism sensitivity condition who claim to have found relief from their symptoms after settling near the telescope.

Elon Musk and his quest to send humans to Mars are investigated. Artificial intelligence is touched upon, and the film considers whether robots might become replacements for human interaction in the future. At the end of the film, Herzog asks multiple interviewees: "Can the Internet dream of itself?"

== Themes ==
When asked by TechCrunch what effect he hoped the film would have on the audience, Herzog replied:

I think we have to abandon this kind of false security that everything is settled now, that we have so much assistance by digital media and robots and artificial intelligence. At the same time, we overlook how vulnerable all this is, and how we are losing the essentials that make us human.

== Reception ==
Lo and Behold received generally favorable reviews from critics. On review aggregator website Rotten Tomatoes, 92% of 144 critics' reviews of the film are positive, with an average rating of 7.5/10; the site's "critics consensus" reads: "Lo and Behold: Reveries of the Connected World finds Werner Herzog bringing his distinctive documentarian gifts to bear on a timely topic with typically thought-provoking results." On Metacritic, the film has a weighted average score of 76 out of 100 based on reviews from 28 critics, indicating "generally favorable" reviews.
