= Pacific View Memorial Park =

Cemetery in Orange County, California, US

Pacific View Memorial Park & Mortuary
- Interactive map of Pacific View Memorial Park & Mortuary

Details
- Established: 1958; 68 years ago
- Location: Corona del Mar, Newport Beach, California, U.S.
- Country: United States
- Coordinates: 33°36′43″N 117°51′10″W
- Owned by: Dignity Memorial
- No. of interments: ~30,000
- Website: Official website

Pacific View Memorial Park is a cemetery located in the Corona del Mar neighborhood of Newport Beach, in Orange County, California, United States. It first opened in 1958, and is the final resting place of actor John Wayne and basketball player Kobe Bryant.

== Notable interments ==
- William Austin (1884–1975), actor
- Les Baxter (1922–1996), musician and composer
- Bijan (1940–2011), fashion designer
- Erica Blasberg (1984–2010), LPGA golfer
- Gianna Bryant (2006–2020), student-athlete and daughter of Kobe
- Kobe Bryant (1978–2020), basketball player
- Edmund Burns (1892–1980), actor
- Jeanne Cagney (1919–1984), actress
- William Cagney (1905–1988), actor
- Jeanne Carmen (1930–2007), actress and model
- Nikki Catsouras (1988–2006), victim of internet trolling
- Jan Crouch (1938–2016), television evangelist
- Paul Crouch (1934–2013), television evangelist
- Tony Curcillo (1931–2020), professional football player, NFL, CFL.
- Dorothy Dare (1911–1981), actress
- Kevin DuBrow (1955–2007), singer
- Don Durant (1932–2005), actor and singer
- Margaret Early (1919–2000), actress
- John Eldredge (1904–1961), actor
- Jack Faulkner (1926–2008), football coach
- Dave Freeman (1934–2013), author
- John Gallaudet (1903–1983), actor
- John Gordy (1935–2009), football player
- Mitch Halpern (1967–2000), boxing referee
- Jeff Hanneman (1964–2013), musician
- Bobby Hatfield (1940–2003), singer
- Rudolf Ising (1903–1992), animator
- Rafer Johnson (1934–2020), Olympic decathlete and actor
- Dick Lane (1899–1982), actor and sportscaster
- Liao Yaoxiang (1906–1968), Chinese general
- Rose Lok (1912–1978), pilot
- Marion Mack (1902–1989), actress and screenwriter
- Ray Malavasi (1930–1987), football coach
- Paul Mantz (1903–1964), pilot
- Freddy Martin (1906–1983), bandleader and saxophonist
- Barbara McLean (1903–1996), film editor
- Gene Polito (1918–2010), cinematographer
- Dennis Ribant (1941–2023), baseball player
- Mary Lee Robb (1926–2006), actress
- James Roosevelt (1907–1991), politician
- Roy Rowland (1910–1995), film director
- Paul Salata (1926–2021), football player
- Ruben Salazar (1928–1970), journalist and civil rights activist
- Rich Saul (1948–2012), football player
- Ralph C. Smedley (1878–1965), toastmaster
- Bryan Stephens (1920–1991), baseball player
- June Storey (1918–1991), actress
- Frank Tallman (1919–1978), pilot
- Kam Tong (1906–1969), actor
- John Wayne (1907–1979), actor
- Robert D. Webb (1903–1990), film director
- Niles Welch (1888–1976), actor
- Bob Wian (1914–1992), businessman
- George Yardley (1928–2004), basketball player
- Lila Zali (1918–2003), dancer
