= ClaimID =

Defunct British social networking website

ClaimID was a website that allowed users to create unique profiles that showed personal websites, profiles at other sites, and other biographical information. The goal of ClaimID was to help users collect and screen information created about them and by them on the web, to help them manage their online identity.

== History ==
ClaimID was founded by Terrell Russell and Fred Stutzman. Both Stutzman and Russell were PhD students at University of North Carolina's Chapel Hill School of Information and Library Science when they began the company.

There was facility to create OpenID along with creating a new account on ClaimID. By October 2013 this was not working.

In August 2007, Peter Saint-Andre submitted an Internet-Draft draft to the IETF defining the MicroID spec. MicroID was a deployed Internet standard designed for use as a lightweight, decentralized identity primitive in web applications and communities.

The official HTML metatag was created:

<meta name="microid" content="mailto+http:sha1:xxxxxxxxxxxxxxxxxxxxxxxxxxxxxxxxxxxxxxxx" />

The ClaimID was deactivated in December 2013. All member pages and authentication services as well as the main website were dismantled. Users can choose to use another OpenID provider, especially if previously having used authentication delegation. Users can also extract their link collection from an available web cache or web archive.

== Importance ==
Both print and digital news outlets, including Businessweek, the San Francisco Chronicle, Reuters, New Scientist and Asian News International, described ClaimID as part of the online reputation management (ORM) movement.
