= Reputation marketing =

The reputation marketing field has evolved from the marriage of the fields reputation management and brand marketing, and involves a brand's reputation being vetted online in real-time by consumers leaving online reviews and citing experiences on social networking sites. With the popularity of social media in the new millennium reputation, vetting has turned from word-of-mouth to the digital platform, forcing businesses to take active measures to stay competitive and profitable.

== Impact ==
A study done by Neilsen in 2012 suggests that 70% of consumers trust online reviews (15% more than in 2008), second only to personal recommendations. This gives credibility to the social proof theory; most famously studied by Muzafer Sherif, and highlighted as one of the six principles of persuasion by Robert Cialdini. The increasing number of review websites such as Yelp and ConsumerAffairs attracted the attention of Harvard Business School which conducted a study of online reviews and their effects on restaurants. The study finds that a one-star increase in Yelp rating leads to a 5–7% increase in restaurant revenue having a major impact on local restaurants and a lesser impact on big chains A similar study conducted at UC Berkeley reports that a half-star improvement on a five-star rating could make it 30-49% more likely that a restaurant will sell out its evening seats.

Reputation marketing is often associated with reputation management and is seen as a means of handling negative reviews. However, reputation marketing differs in that it also seeks to manage positive feedback as a way to attract new customers. Reputation marketing is a proactive approach for building brand presence. Reputation marketing is not a new strategy. The Better Business Bureau has been around since 1912 and is one of the most notable and well-known consumer review organizations. With the surplus of social media review sites available to the average consumer, businesses are forced to closely monitor their reputations and find new and creative ways to use social media to stay competitive in today's economy.

== Influence of social networking sites ==
Online reviews have a tremendous influence on consumers' purchases since they can read evaluations and opinions of the items they are considering. Amazon was the first company to invite consumers to post reviews on the internet and many others have since done the same. The average customer finds social media more trustworthy than brand-generated marketing making social media more effective than television commercials, advertising signs, and internet banners at drawing potential consumers; however, reviews by people the consumer does not know are only 2% as effective.

The chart below shows the most viewed review websites of 2017 according to Alexa:

| Review Website | Avg. Monthly U.S. Traffic |
|---|---|
| Google My Business | 158.03 million |
| Facebook | 85.57 million |
| Amazon | 85.44 million |
| Yelp | 40.47 million |
| Trip Advisor | 28.27 million |
| Yellowpages | 10.5 million |
| BBB (Better Business Bureau) | 6.15 million |
| Manta | 6.48 million |
| Angies List | 5.44 million |
| Foursquare | 3.67 million |

== Effects on businesses ==
A business's online reputation can have a critical impact on its success or failure, with more than 3 out of every 4 people preferring positively reviewed businesses over negative ones. The impact of negative reviews may even affect a business's ability to secure financial assistance as banks and other financial institutions check a company's online ratings as part of the application process. In today's non-private, social society it would be plausible to see that one's business could be affected by what people say about it, the owner, or employees online.

Reputation marketing and building a good online reputation are critically important. However, they are not stand-alone growth strategies. Reputation marketing yields the most positive returns when coupled with other online and offline marketing efforts since the effectiveness of these efforts is increased by a good reputation. The popularity of smart phones have made it almost essential for businesses to be mobile-friendly with click-to-call, click-to-map, and instant review options readily available. Although the food industry seems to be most impacted by online reviews, experts predict that doctors, contractors, surgeons, accountants and many other local business owners will see more and more online reviews due to changes in search engines.

== Economical impact ==
The benefits of online platforms on the economy are supported by predictions of economic theory, with most consumers preferring convenience, buyer options, and free access to information. Product ratings and reviews are an important factor in how consumers choose products and services, with product ratings (usually in stars) attracting customers while personal reviews have the greater impact on the actual buying decision. Spending increases more than 30% with companies that have positive reviews companies with negative reviews may face a substantial drop in consumer traffic. Research conducted in the United Kingdom by Barclays looking at how greater responses of businesses to the increase of customer feedback would improve business performance, shows that the economic output could grow by an additional 0.07% between 2016 and 2026. The effects could lead to an increase in the economic output of the United Kingdom by £555 million ($747 million) per year over the average growth rate by the year 2026.
