= Mug shot publishing industry =

Niche market of tabloid journalism

The mugshot publishing industry is a niche market of tabloid journalism in the United States. The industry consists of companies that publish mugshots and booking details of individuals arrested by law enforcement agencies. These companies publish the arrest information in tabloids, through local and multi-jurisdictional search websites. The related reputation management industry profits when individuals pay a fee to have their mugshot removed from one or more websites; often the same entity owns both the publishing site and the removal service, which has led to allegations of and lawsuits for extortionate practices as well as arrests and convictions of mugshot business owners on charges of identity theft, money laundering, and extortion. In 2018 the journal of the American Bar Association called the industry an "online extortion scheme."

== Publishing ==
The owners of mugshot websites have stated their belief that publishing the information can spur tips to Crime Stoppers and deter others from committing crimes for fear of their information being published.

Arrest data and photos are public record, and can be accessed through the websites of law enforcement agencies. However, many agencies in small cities, towns and counties do not provide online data. To reduce the probability of their mugshot going online, at least one Florida attorney, David Haenel, suggests that his clients pick a rural sheriff's department when they surrender to authorities.

== Removal ==
Some sites remove information free of charge if a complainant provides proof they were found not guilty or that the charges were dropped. Other sites charge a fee regardless of the disposition of the case. This controversy has led some state legislatures to propose bills to regulate the industry.

Mugshots and the associated information are published regardless of whether or not the person is guilty or has been convicted of the crime they were arrested for. The industry has become controversial because of the lack of case disposition.

It has been argued that it is pointless to pay to have mugshots removed from the Web because "the Internet never forgets." Multiple archival services store the content of most websites on a periodic basis, and that content can be retrieved at any time in the future.

== Discrimination ==
Mugshot publication sites are often pulled up during routine searches online for things as innocent as employment or housing. Even if someone has had their record sealed, expunged or reduced, and even if the mugshot publishing site has removed the offending photos, they can still be located. One company in Utah was in 2018 outed in a leaked internal document for hiring "White Hat Hackers" to dig through internet archives and other sites that would not be readily visible to the typical internet user in order to eliminate otherwise qualified candidates.

== Criticism ==
In 2018 the journal of the American Bar Association called the industry an "online extortion scheme."

Some mugshot publishers refuse to remove records regardless of if the charges were dropped, expunged, or for those who were found not guilty.

In 2013 Forbes reported that "many of these sites have either been set up by the company themselves, or have created financial relationships with the owners of the sites to remove content when paid. Most of the biggest ORM firms are involved in this kind of mafia extortion."

In 2013 David Kravets, writing for Wired referred to it as a racket.

In 2013 the Better Business Bureau launched an investigation and concluded there is a First Amendment right to operate such businesses, but investigators felt they were "using high pressure and unethical business practice to intimidate individuals."

In 2013 the owner of a mugshot removal website directed blame at Police and Sheriff departments where mugshots are posted online after an arrest, and are the source of mugshot website photos. He stated, "Here's the thing, the police can stop this overnight and that's the part no one is talking about. Why are (authorities) posting the mugshot of someone who simply missed traffic court?"

In 2012 Kenneth B. Nunn, law professor at the University of Florida's Fredric G. Levin College of Law, said the mugshot sites look like "a seedy business," but, "There's nothing wrong with posting these further," he said. "It's close to extortion, although not quite because there is not a threat to harm reputation, but to improve it," he said.

In 2012 Gwinnett County Georgia District Attorney said, "It's wrong but not a violation of the criminal laws. Arbitrarily charging for mugshot removal doesn't fit the legal definition of extortion because the photos are public record."

== Private attempts to block industry ==
On October 5, 2013, David Segal, a reporter at the New York Times, published an article critical of the mugshot publishing industry. Prior to publication and seemingly in response to this criticism, Google took steps to lower mugshot sites' rankings in their search algorithms so that such pictures no longer appear in the first page of search results when a person is searched by name. According to the New York Times article, payment processors such as Visa, MasterCard, Discover, American Express, and PayPal were in process of terminating processing payments to mugshot websites and related removal sites. Ten days later CNN Money reported that according to American Express, it had severed all ties, and that other companies were still in the process of cutting ties with the mugshot industry.

== Legislation ==
Several state legislatures have introduced bills to regulate the mugshot publishing industry. These bills often require that operators of mugshot websites remove information about individuals who were arrested but never convicted. This removal would have to occur after a specified period of time and without charging a fee to the person arrested.

Arizona
On April 1, 2019 Arizona Governor Doug Ducey signed Arizona House Bill 2191, which took effect on August 27, 2019. This law created two new statutes, A.R.S. § 44-7901 and § 44-7902 pertaining to "mugshot website operators". The operative portion of the law, A.R.S. § 44-7902(B), provides: "A mugshot website operator may not use criminal justice records or the names, addresses, telephone numbers and other information contained in criminal justice records for the purpose of soliciting business for pecuniary gain, including requiring the payment of a fee or other valuable consideration in exchange for removing or revising criminal justice records that have been published on a website or other publication." The law provides for daily civil penalties starting at $100 per day and increasing to $500 per day after 60 days. However, the law also contains broad exceptions explaining the statute "does not apply to any act performed for the purpose of disseminating news to the public, including the gathering, publishing or broadcasting information to the public for a news-related purpose ... ."
California
On August 15, 2015 California Governor Jerry Brown signed Senator Jerry Hill's Senate Bill 1027, which went into effect on January 1, 2015, that prohibits websites from publishing arrest mugshots and then charging to take them down. Specifically, the legislation makes it unlawful to solicit or accept payment to remove, correct or modify mugshots. A civil action may be brought against any website that violates the law. The person or entity who brings suit may seek damages equal to the greater of $1,000 per violation or the actual damages suffered. SB 1027 does not restrict access to arrest records and booking photos by the media and interested individuals.
Colorado
On April 11, 2014 House Bill 14-1407 was signed into law. House Bill 14-1407 requires commercial websites that charges a fee to remove people's mugshots or other identifying information to remove that information for free if the person was found innocent of the crime for which they were arrested.
Connecticut
On July 15, 2014 The Connecticut State Supreme Court issued a ruling that restricts the amount of information police are required to release about arrests. The court ruled that police are required only to release basic "blotter" information about arrests, including the name and address of the person arrested, the date, time and place of the arrest, the criminal charges and a news release or narrative of the arrest. Under the ruling, mugshots do not have to be disclosed.
Florida
On June 5, 2017 Florida Governor Rick Scott signed senate Bill 118, which took effect on July 1, 2018, prohibiting a person or entity engaged in publishing or disseminating arrest booking photographs from soliciting or accepting a fee or other payment to remove a photograph. The new law also requires any such entity to remove such arrest booking photographs within a ten day time frame after the receipt of the written request. Should the publisher of the photo refuse or neglect to comply, the individual will then be authorized to bring a civil court action before the court to impose a civil penalty and be compensated for attorney fees and court costs of the individual. The text of the law is found in § 901.43 of the 2020 Florida Statutes.
Georgia
A new law went into effect in Georgia on May 6, 2013, that regulates how mugshot websites handle requests to remove an individual's image. Specifically, the bill requires mugshot websites to remove images of persons who were cleared of their charges and cannot charge a fee for the removal. The removal must be completed within 30 days of request and the website cannot charge a fee for the removal. Georgia enacted another bill, effective July 1, 2014, which prohibits the disclosure of arrest booking photographs except under certain circumstances; to provide for related matters; to repeal conflicting laws; and for other purposes.
Missouri
On July 9, 2014 Gov. Jay Nixon signed legislation making it a misdemeanor to publish police booking photos on websites and then seek money to take the photos down. HB1665 became effective on August 28, 2014.
New Jersey
New Jersey introduced a bill that would prevent the dissemination of mugshots until the suspect has been found guilty. The measure (A3906), approved 9-0 with one abstention by the Assembly Law and Public Safety Committee, would amend the state's open public records act to make confidential the photographs of anyone arrested if they have not yet been convicted.
Oregon
A bill was introduced in Oregon's House in 2013 that would forbid any law enforcement agency from publishing mugshots online. A single individual's mugshot and booking information could still be obtained through written requests submitted in person. The bill has been amended removing those provisions but now requires mugshot sites to remove mugshots within 30 days after receiving paperwork showing that the charges did not result in a conviction.
South Carolina
Lawmakers, led by Sen. Paul Thurmond (R-Charleston), on Feb 23, 2016, enacted bill S255 that would require websites take down booking photos if the people aren’t found guilty.
Texas
During its 2013 legislative session, the Texas State Senate passed two bills regulating the businesses who publish mugshots and accept payment to remove the information. It requires these businesses to publish either an e-mail address, fax number, or a mailing address to allow people to contact the business. Any individual can contact the business disputing the accuracy of the information being published by the business. The business has 45 days to respond, in writing, about the dispute and the results of its investigation into the dispute. The bill also forbids these businesses from publishing the arrest records of anyone who has not been convicted and establishes a fine for those business that do so.
Utah
On April 1, 2013, Utah Governor Gary Herbert signed HB 408 into law. The bill prohibits booking photos from appearing on mugshot websites that require payment to remove the image. It requires that any individual requesting booking photos to sign a sworn statement that the image they received will not be used these kinds of websites. Violations of that sworn statement could result in criminal charges of lying to police.
Virginia
On March 23, 2015 SB 720 was signed into law. SB720 creates a civil action against any person who disseminates, publishes, or maintains or causes to be disseminated, published, or maintained the criminal history record information of an individual pertaining to that individual's charge or arrest for a criminal offense and solicits, requests, or accepts money or other thing of value for removing such information. Such person shall be liable to the individual who is the subject of the information for actual damages or $500, whichever is greater, in addition to reasonable attorney fees and costs.

== Litigation ==
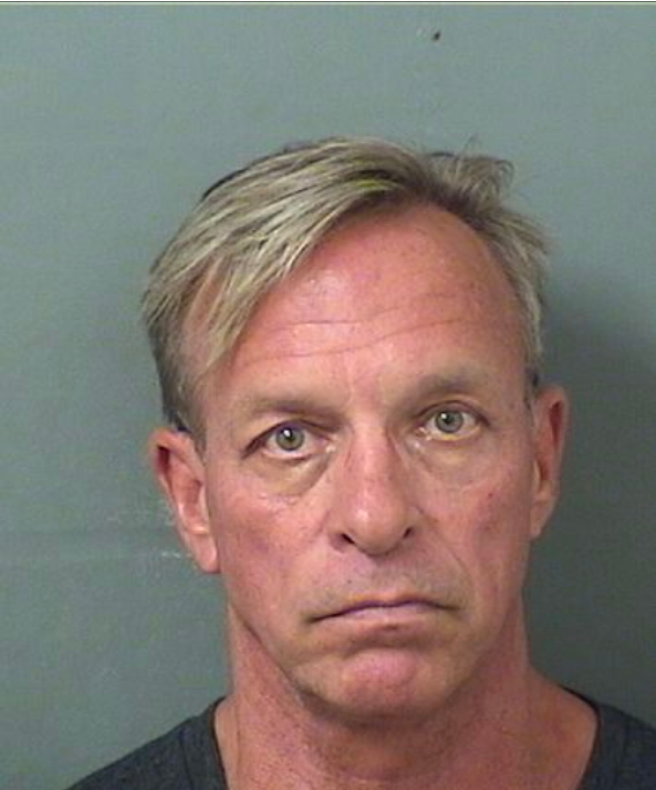
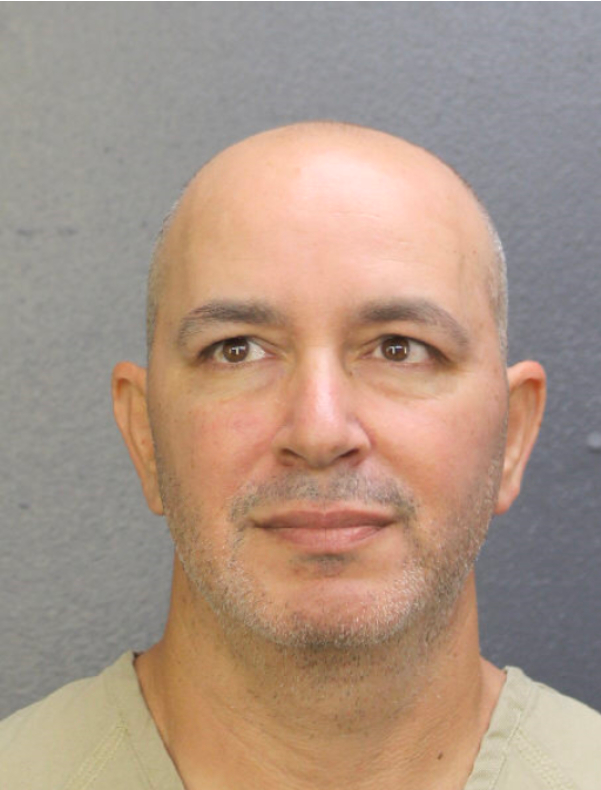
Mug shots of convicted felons Thomas Keesee (left) and Sahar Sarid (right), Keesee and Sarid were arrested, extradited, and convicted among others to California for cyber-extortion and identity theft in connection with the mugshots.com website

On December 3, 2012, a case was filed in the Lucas County Court of Common Pleas, in Ohio, against 14 mugshot publishers. On December 27, 2013, a settlement was reached and Judge Zouhary signed an order dismissing the litigation with prejudice after the mugshot websites claimed to not be in violation of any laws. However, the websites did agree to remove the plaintiffs' mugshots and to no longer charge to process mugshot removals.

Lawyers in Ohio filed a lawsuit on behalf of three plaintiffs. The suit contends that more than 250,000 people in Ohio have been harmed by the mugshot web sites. A settlement was reached in the lawsuit on December 27, 2013 and several of the mugshot publishing companies involved agreed to remove the plaintiffs' mugshots as well as pay a settlement.

On January 20, 2016 multiple plaintiffs filed a class action lawsuit against Mugshots.com and Unpublish and its owners Sahar Sarid and Thomas Keesee and operators in Illinois. The case is currently pending in the United States District Court for the Northern District of Illinois. The case is styled Gabiola, et al. v. Keesee, et al., no. 1:16-cv-02076.

On May 16, 2018 California Attorney General Becerra announced criminal charges of identity theft, money laundering, and extortion against the four individuals believed to be behind the cyber exploitation website mugshots.com. The four men charged have been arrested. Thomas Keesee and Sahar Sarid were charged in an affidavit that characterized the business they own as "permeated with fraud" and described their efforts to conceal their identities: "listing their business address in Nevis, West Indies, registering their domain name in Belize and using a website hosting company in Australia." Kishore Vidya Bhavnanie and David Usdan were also arrested. Several of their mugshots are available online. All four were extradited to California to face charges. On May 5, 2025 Thomas Keesee, Sahar Sarid, and Kishore Bhavnanie were convicted of attempted extortion and identity theft, making them felons.

== See also ==
- Mug book
- Class action
