= Reputation management =

Marketing technique

Reputation management is the deliberate influence, control, enhancement, or concealment of an individual's or group's reputation. It is a marketing technique used to modify a person's or a company's reputation in a positive way. Online reputation management (ORM) involves overseeing and influencing the search engine results related to products and services.

The ethical gray areas of online reputation management include the removal of mug shots from websites, the use of astroturfing in customer review sites, the censorship of complaints, and the use of search engine optimization tactics to influence results. In other cases, the ethical lines are clear; some reputation management companies are closely connected to websites that publish unverified and libelous statements about people. These unethical companies often impose exorbitant fees, amounting to thousands of dollars, to remove these posts – temporarily – from their websites.

Online reputation management, or ORM, focuses on the management of product and service search results within the digital space. A variety of electronic markets and online communities, such as eBay, Amazon, and Alibaba, have ORM systems built in, and using effective control nodes can minimize the threat and protect systems from possible misuses and abuses by malicious nodes in decentralized overlay networks. Big Data has the potential to be employed in overseeing and enhancing the reputation of organizations.

== History ==
Public relations as a field was developed to manage the image reputation of a company or individual. The sub-field reputation management was created to broaden public relations outside of media relations.

As the Internet became widely available to individuals in the 1990s, online reputation management (ORM) became part of public relations. ORM focuses on a long-term reputation strategy that is consistent across Internet platforms. ORM includes search engine reputation management which is designed to counter negative search results and elevate positive content. Advocates of ORM say that if ignored, online perceptions may harm a company's performance.

ORM involves the monitoring of the reputation of an individual or a brand on the internet via social media platforms, addressing content which is potentially damaging to it, and attempting to solve problems before they cause financial damage. Reputation management also involves suppressing negative search results, while highlighting positive ones.

A 2015 study commissioned by the American Association of Advertising Agencies concluded that 4 percent of consumers believed advertisers and marketers practice integrity.

According to Susan Crawford, a cyberlaw specialist from Cardozo Law School, most websites will remove negative content when contacted to avoid litigation. The Wall Street Journal noted that in some cases, writing a letter to a detractor can have unintended consequences, though the company makes an effort to avoid writing to certain website operators that are likely to respond negatively. The company says it respects the First Amendment and does not try to remove "genuinely newsworthy speech." It generally cannot remove major government-related news stories from established publications or court records.

In 2015, Jon Ronson, author of "So You've Been Publicly Shamed", said that reputation management helped some people who became agoraphobic due to public humiliation from online shaming, but that it was an expensive service that many could not afford.

== Campaigns in popular media ==
In 2011, controversy around the Taco Bell restaurant chain arose when public accusations were made that their "seasoned beef" product was only made up of only 35% real beef. A class action lawsuit was filed by the law firm Beasley Allen against Taco Bell. The suit was voluntarily withdrawn with Beasley Allen citing that "From the inception of this case, we stated that if Taco Bell would make certain changes regarding disclosure and marketing of its 'seasoned beef' product, the case could be dismissed." Taco Bell responded to the case being withdrawn by launching a reputation management campaign titled "Would it kill you to say you're sorry?" that ran advertisements in various news outlets in print and online, which attempted to draw attention to the voluntary withdrawal of the case.

In 2015, Volkswagen, a German automobile manufacturer, faced a massive €30 billion controversy. A scandal erupted when it was revealed that 11 million of its vehicles globally had been fitted with devices designed to mask the true levels of harmful emissions. The reaction from the company's investors was swift as Volkswagen's stock value started to fall rapidly. The brand released a two-minute video in which the CEO and other representatives apologized after pleading guilty. However, this wasn't enough to change the public perception. The automotive giant had to bring in four PR firms led by Hering Schuppener, a German crisis communications and reputation management agency. To attempt to rebuild its reputation, Volkswagen launched an initiative to transition to electric motors. The company released print media and published pieces about its commitment to developing electric and hybrid vehicle models to improve its CSR image.

In 2024, a London restaurant was review bombed by a cybercrime group to extort £10,000. The negative reviews brought the eatery's Google rating down to 2.3 stars from a 4.9 stars before the attack. Maximatic Media, an online reputation management firm, was hired to identify the origin of the malicious reviews and found that they were being generated by a botnet. The agency worked with Google for the removal of these fake reviews to restore the restaurant's online reputation to a 4.8-star rating.

== Examples ==
Organisations attempt to manage their reputations on websites that many people visit, such as eBay, Wikipedia, and Google. Some of the tactics used by reputation management firms include:

- Modifying the way results from searches are displayed on a search engine such as white papers and make appear in priority positive customer testimonials in order to push down negative content.
- Publishing original, positive websites and social media profiles, with the aim of outperforming negative results in a search.
- Submitting online press releases to authoritative websites in order to promote brand presence and suppress negative content.
- Submitting legal take-down requests if they have or pretend to have been libeled.
- Getting mentions of the business or individual on third-party sites that rank highly on Google.
- Creating fake, positive reviews of the individual or business to counteract negative ones.
- Using spambots and denial-of-service attacks to force sites with damaging content off the web entirely.
- Astroturfing third-party websites by creating anonymous accounts that create positive reviews or lash out against negative ones.
- Proactively offering free products to prominent reviewers.
- Removing online mug shots.
- Proactively responding to public criticism stemming from recent changes.
- Removing or suppressing images that are embarrassing or violate copyright.
- Wikiturfing, also called wikiwashing, in which corporations contact Wikipedia editors to remove allegedly incorrect information from the Wikipedia pages of businesses they represent, and "obfuscating... their role of profit seeking corporations...[and] promoting a misleading image of themselves associated with the general values of wikis and Wikipedia".
- Forbidding any comments

== Ethics ==
The practice of reputation management raises many ethical questions. It is widely disagreed upon where the line for disclosure, astroturfing, and censorship should be drawn. Firms have been known to hire staff to pose as bloggers on third-party sites without disclosing they were paid, and some have been criticized for asking websites to remove negative posts. The exposure of unethical reputation management may itself be risky to the reputation of a firm that attempts it if known.

In 2007, Google declared there to be nothing inherently wrong with reputation management, and even introduced a toolset in 2011 for users to monitor their online identity and request the removal of unwanted content. Many firms are selective about clients they accept. For example, they may avoid individuals who committed violent crimes who are looking to push information about their crimes lower on search results.

In 2010, a study showed that Naymz, one of the first Web 2.0 services to provide utilities for Online Reputation Management (ORM), had developed a method to assess the online reputation of its members (RepScore) that was rather easy to deceive. The study found that the highest level of online reputation was easily achieved by engaging a small social group of nine persons who connect with each other and provide reciprocal positive feedbacks and endorsements. As of December 2017, Naymz was shut down.

In 2015, the online retailer Amazon.com sued 1,114 people who were paid to publish fake five-star reviews for products. These reviews were created using a website for Macrotasking, Fiverr.com. Several other companies offer fake Yelp and Facebook reviews, and one journalist amassed five-star reviews for a business that doesn't exist, from social media accounts that have also given overwhelmingly positive reviews to "a chiropractor in Arizona, a hair salon in London, a limo company in North Carolina, a realtor in Texas, and a locksmith in Florida, among other far-flung businesses". In 2007, a study by the University of California Berkeley found that some sellers on eBay were undertaking reputation management by selling products at a discount in exchange for positive feedback to game the system.

In 2016, the Washington Post detailed 25 court cases, at least 15 of which had false addresses for the defendant. The court cases had similar language and the defendant agreed to the injunction by the plaintiff, which allowed the reputation management company to issue takedown notices to Google, Yelp, Leagle, Ripoff Report, various news sites, and other websites.

Another form has been buying reviews for online review platforms of businesses like Google Maps and Tripadvisor. This can have two forms, owners seeking to improve their ratings without fixing the business issues or damaging competitors ratings, by buying low rating reviews.

== See also ==
- Brand safety
- Censorship
- False advertising
- Greenwashing
- Impression management
- Online identity management
- Online presence management
- Peer-to-peer § Security and trust
- Reputation capital
- Reputation laundering
- Reputation marketing
- Reputation system
- Sentiment analysis
- Smear campaign
- Sockpuppet
- Spin (propaganda)
- Streisand effect
- Libel
