= European Sportsperson of the Year =

Sports award

The PAP European Sportsperson of the Year (Polish: Ankieta PAP na 10 najlepszych sportowców Europy) is an annual sports award presented by Polish Press Agency (PAP). Both male and female athletes are considered for the award by a panel of 27 international news agencies. The winner is announced each year on the second Christmas Day.

== History ==
It was founded by Włodzimierz Źróbik and has been awarded annually since 1958. The European Sportsperson of the Year award honours the sportsperson deemed to have performed the best over the previous year, based on voting by 27 international news agencies. The inaugural winner of the award was Olympic gold medallist Zdzisław Krzyszkowiak who specialized in the 3000 metre steeplechase.

The 27 agencies that are part of the panel are: EFE (Spain) France Presse (France), Agerpress (Romania), ANP (Netherlands), APA (Austria), ATA (Albania), Belga (Belgium), Belta (Belarus), BTA (Bulgaria), CTK (Czech Republic), DPA (Germany), Elta (Lithuania), FENA (Bosnia and Herzegovina), HINA (Croatia), LETA (Latvia), Lusa (Portugal), Moldpres (Moldova), SDA-ATS (Switzerland), SHGSK (Kosovo), SID (Germany), Sita (Slovakia), STA (Slovenia), Tanjug (Serbia), TASS (Russia), Ukrinform (Ukraine) and PAP (Poland).

The most wins are held by representatives of track and field sports (24), followed by tennis (14) and Formula 1 (9). Roger Federer and Novak Djokovic are the most successful individual winners with five victories, while Valeriy Brumel and Michael Schumacher hold three victories each. In 2005, Roger Federer and Yelena Isinbayeva were declared joint winners. So far, 47 male and 17 female athletes received the title of PAP European Sportsperson of the Year.

== Winners (1958–2010) ==
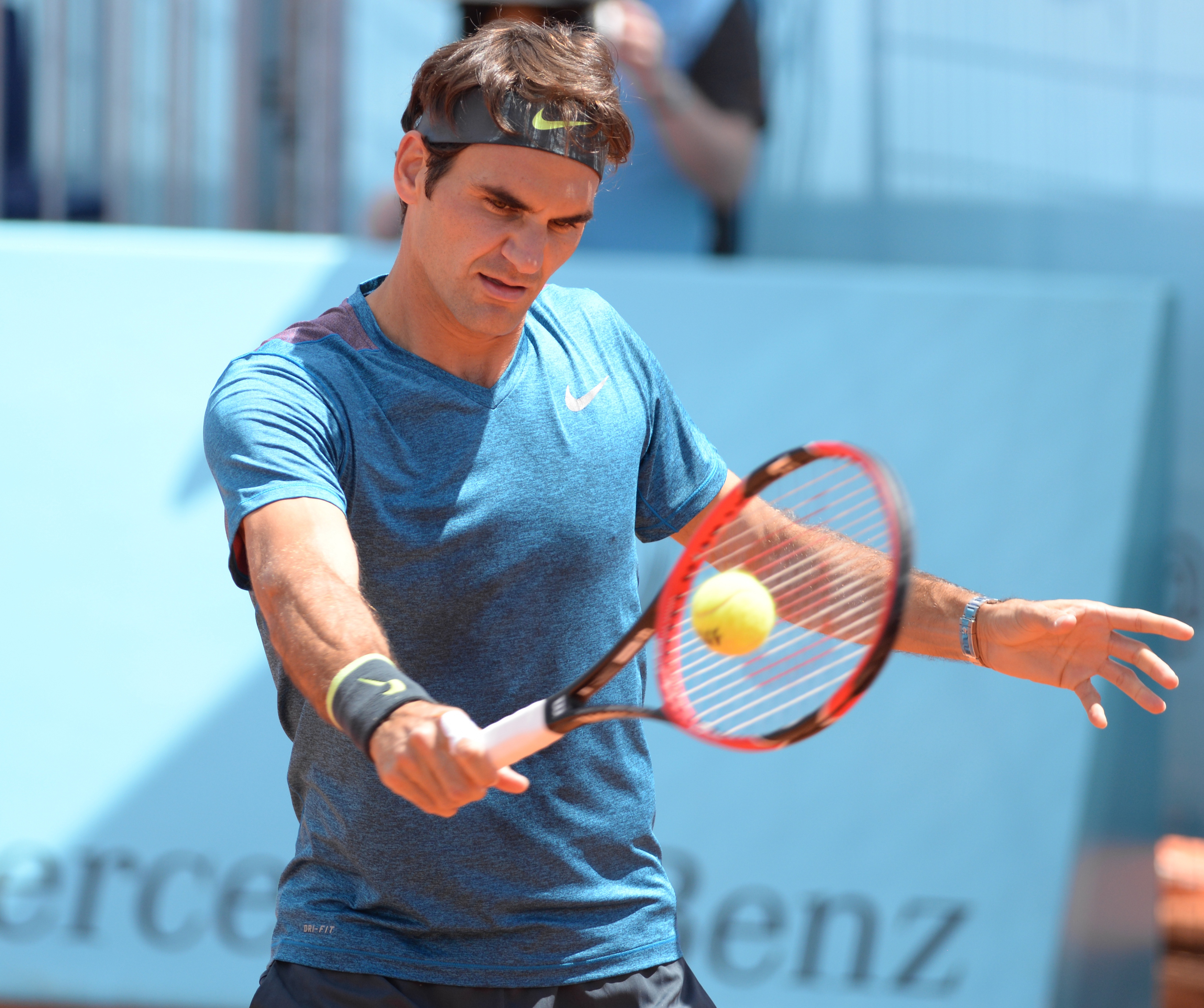
Roger Federer is the most successful athlete with five wins overall

List of past winners from 1958 to 2010:

- Zdzisław Krzyszkowiak (Poland, 1958)
- Vasili Kuznetsov (USSR, 1959)
- Yury Vlasov (USSR, 1960)
- Valeriy Brumel (USSR, 1961, 1962, 1963)
- Lidiya Skoblikova (USSR, 1964)
- Michel Jazy (France, 1965)
- Irena Kirszenstein (Poland, 1966)
- Jean-Claude Killy (France, 1967, 1968)
- Eddy Merckx (Belgium, 1969, 1970)
- Juha Väätäinen (Finland, 1971)
- Lasse Virén (Finland, 1972)
- Kornelia Ender (East Germany, 1973)
- Irena Szewińska (Poland, 1974)
- Kornelia Ender (East Germany, 1975)
- Nadia Comăneci (Romania, 1976)
- Rosemarie Ackermann (East Germany, 1977)
- Vladimir Yashchenko (USSR, 1978)
- Sebastian Coe (Great Britain, 1979)
- Vladimir Salnikov (USSR, 1980)
- Sebastian Coe (Great Britain, 1981)
- Daley Thompson (Great Britain, 1982)
- Jarmila Kratochvílová (Czechoslovakia, 1983)
- Michael Gross (West Germany, 1984)
- Sergey Bubka (USSR, 1985)
- Heike Drechsler (East Germany, 1986)
- Stephen Roche (Ireland, 1987)
- Steffi Graf (West Germany, 1988, 1989)
- Stefan Edberg (Sweden, 1990)
- Katrin Krabbe (Germany, 1991)
- Nigel Mansell (Great Britain, 1992)
- Linford Christie (Great Britain, 1993)
- Johann Olav Koss (Norway, 1994)
- Jonathan Edwards (Great Britain, 1995)
- Svetlana Masterkova (Russia, 1996)
- Martina Hingis (Switzerland, 1997)
- Mika Häkkinen (Finland, 1998)
- Gabriela Szabo (Romania, 1999)
- Inge de Bruijn (Netherlands, 2000)
- Michael Schumacher (Germany, 2001, 2002, 2003)
- Roger Federer (2004)
- Roger Federer and Yelena Isinbayeva (Switzerland and Russia, 2005)
- Roger Federer (Switzerland, 2006, 2007)
- Rafael Nadal (Spain, 2008)
- Roger Federer (Switzerland, 2009)
- Rafael Nadal (Spain, 2010)

== Winners since 2011 ==
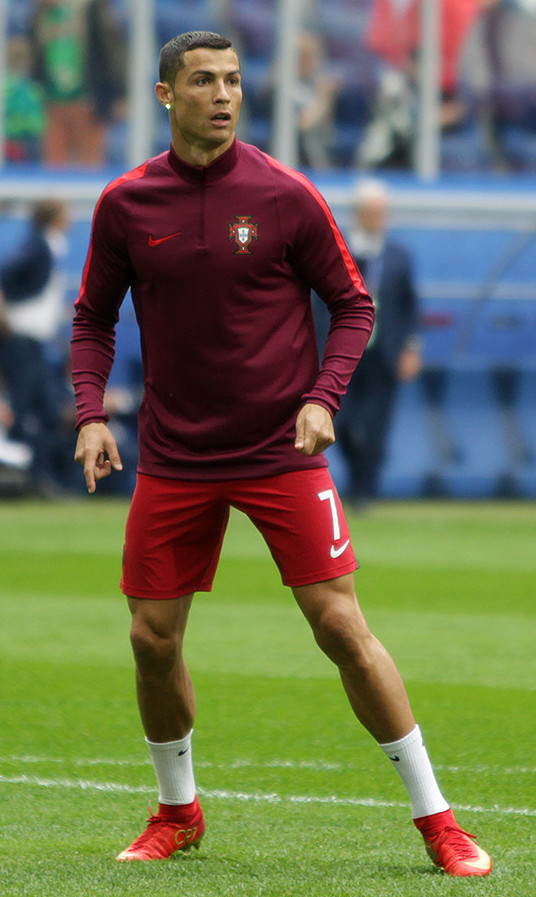
Cristiano Ronaldo was the first footballer to be awarded the title

Year	1st	2nd	3rd
2011	Novak Djokovic (SRB) (Tennis)	Sebastian Vettel (GER) (Formula 1)	Dirk Nowitzki (GER) (Basketball)
2012	Sebastian Vettel (GER) (Formula 1)	Bradley Wiggins (GBR) (Cycling)	Mo Farah (GBR) (Athletics)
2013	Sebastian Vettel (GER) (Formula 1)	Rafael Nadal (ESP) (Tennis)	Mo Farah (GBR) (Athletics)
2014	Lewis Hamilton (UK) (Formula 1)	Manuel Neuer (GER) (Football)	Novak Djokovic (SRB) (Tennis)
2015	Novak Djokovic (SRB) (Tennis)	Lewis Hamilton (UK) (Formula 1)	Dafne Schippers (NED) (Athletics)
2016	Cristiano Ronaldo (POR) (Football)	Andy Murray (UK) (Tennis)	Katinka Hosszú (HUN) (Swimming)
2017	Cristiano Ronaldo (POR) (Football)	Lewis Hamilton (UK) (Formula 1)	Roger Federer (SWI) (Tennis)
2018	Novak Djokovic (SRB) (Tennis)	Luka Modrić (CRO) (Football)	Lewis Hamilton (GBR) (Formula 1)
2019	Lewis Hamilton (GBR) (Formula 1)	Rafael Nadal (ESP) (Tennis)	Marcel Hirscher (AUT) (Alpine skiing)
2020	Robert Lewandowski (POL) (Football)	Lewis Hamilton (GBR) (Formula 1)	Armand Duplantis (SWE) (Pole vault)
2021	Novak Djokovic (SRB) (Tennis)	Robert Lewandowski (POL) (Football)	Max Verstappen (NED) (Formula One)
2022	Iga Świątek (POL) (Tennis)	Armand Duplantis (SWE) (Athletics)	Max Verstappen (NED) (Formula One)
2023	Novak Djokovic (SRB) (Tennis)	Max Verstappen (NED) (Formula One)	Armand Duplantis (SWE) (Athletics)
2024	Léon Marchand (FRA) (Swimming)	Tadej Pogačar (SLO) (Cycling)	Armand Duplantis (SWE) (Athletics)
2025	Armand Duplantis (SWE) (Athletics)	Carlos Alcaraz (ESP) (Tennis)	Tadej Pogačar (SLO) (Cycling)

== Winners by country ==
Country	Number
USSR	9
Germany (Note: Three wins as part of West Germany are included.)	9
Great Britain	8
Switzerland	6
Poland	5
Serbia	5
East Germany	4
France	3
Finland	3
Belgium	2
Romania	2
Russia	2
Spain	2
Portugal	2
Czechoslovakia	1
Ireland	1
Sweden	1
Norway	1
Netherlands	1

== See also ==
- European Athlete of the Year
