= Media Information Agency =

- Native name: Медиумска информативна агенција
- Formerly: Macedonian Information Agency
- Company type: Public
- Industry: News agency
- Founded: 1992
- Headquarters: Skopje, North Macedonia
- Website: mia.mk

Media Information Agency (MIA; Macedonian: Медиумска информативна агенција, romanized: Mediumska informativna agencija) is a public information service of North Macedonia. It is among the news agencies that provide professional standards in the sphere of its basic function - covering events, news and information. MIA works 24 hours a day distributing news in Macedonian, English and Albanian supporting the entire information space - printed and electronic media in the country, the media on Macedonian language abroad, the embassies of North Macedonia and other organisations, institutions, missions

== History ==
MIA was established by Parliament's decision in 1992. By the decision of the Government of the Republic of North Macedonia in 1997, MIA started to work in 1998. It is registered as stock company.

MIA launched the first news on September 30, 1998.

== Membership and cooperation ==
=== Membership ===
MIA is a member of ABNA-SE - 27th Association of the Balkan News Agencies – Southeast Europe.

Information pool: ROMPRES (Romania), BTA (Bulgaria), ATA (Albania), Tanjug (Serbia), MINA (Montenegro), FENA and SRNA (Bosnia and Herzegovina), STA (Slovenia), HINA (Croatia), ANA - MPA (Greece), Anadolu Agency (Turkey), APA (Austria), EFE (Spain).

=== Cooperation ===
MIA co-operates with the largest news agencies - the Agence France-Presse (AFP), the Chinese Xinhua, the iranian IRNA, the British World Service BBC, the German DPA, the Russian ITAR-TASS. Worldwide information services Deutsche Welle, Free Europe, the Voice of America are using the MIA services.
