= European Alliance of News Agencies =

Federation of news agencies in Europe

- Abbreviation: EANA
- Formation: 21 August 1956; 70 years ago
- Type: Nonprofit
- Registration no.: CH-035.6.031.208.5
- Headquarters: Bern, Switzerland
- Members: 33 news agencies, 1 suspended (2025)
- Official language: English
- Secretary General: Alexandru Ion Giboi
- President: Stefano De Alessandri
- Board of directors: Patrick Lacroix; Claudia Nicolae; Aimilios Perdikaris
- Website: www.newsalliance.org

The European Alliance of News Agencies (EANA) is a federation of news agencies in Europe. The organisation was founded on 21 August 1956 and is based in Bern at the seat of the Swiss Telegraphic Agency (sda). EANA's predecessor Agences Alliées was founded in 1924 and was active until World War II when its activities were discontinued.

According to its statutes, the purpose of EANA is "to safeguard and promote the common interests of its members", "to secure that member news agencies can work as providers of unbiased news". EANA also states that it supports the principles of freedom of the press and shall strive to facilitate for member news agencies to work in accordance with these principles.

According to a London School of Economics study on news agencies published in 2019, "[b]ecause of their extensive embeddedness within national media systems, as well as their significant engagement with key stakeholders, news agencies offer a fruitful but neglected focus for a comprehensive and comparative study aiming to understand these structural changes in the contemporary media environment".

Since 21 September 2018, Peter Kropsch, the CEO of the German news agency Deutsche Presse-Agentur (dpa), had been the President of EANA.

For two years since 26 September 2014, Clive Marshall, the CEO of the British news agency Press Association (PA), had been the President of EANA.

Jonas Eriksson, the CEO of the Swedish TT News Agency, was the President of EANA between 2016 and 2018.

EANA offers each year a quality award to its members. In 2015, the French news agency Agence France-Presse (AFP) and its Global News Director, Michèle Léridon, have been awarded the EANA Award for Excellence 2015.

== Membership ==
As of 2023, there are 32 members of the European Alliance of News Agencies:

- Agence France-Presse
- Agenzia Nazionale Stampa Associata
- Albanian Telegraphic Agency
- Anadolu Agency
- Agència de Notícies Andorrana
- Athens-Macedonian News Agency
- Austria Press Agency
- Belga
- Bulgarian News Agency
- Croatian News Agency
- Cyprus News Agency
- Czech News Agency
- Algemeen Nederlands Persbureau
- FENA
- Finnish News Agency
- Deutsche Presse-Agentur
- Magyar Távirati Iroda
- Swiss Telegraphic Agency
- Kosova Press
- Lusa News Agency
- Norwegian News Agency
- PA Media
- Polish Press Agency
- Ritzau
- Agerpres
- News Agency of the Slovak Republic
- Slovenian Press Agency
- EFE
- Azerbaijan State News Agency
- Tanjug
- TT News Agency
- Ukrinform

=== Suspended ===
- TASS, Suspended on 28 February 2022. (Note: Suspended on 27 February 2022 for "violation of the purpose of EANA as it is laid out in the Statutes of the Alliance, not being able to provide unbiased news, which stand at the core of EANA's mission statement".)
