= Cyprus News Agency =

Cyprus News Agency logo

The Cyprus News Agency (Greek: Κυπριακό Πρακτορείο Ειδήσεων；Turkish: Kıbrıs Haber Ajansı), or CNA is the major news agency in Cyprus.

CNA currently has commercial agreements with Reuters, AFP, ITAR-TASS, RIA NOVOSTI and MENA and cooperation agreements with ANA, SANA, XINHUA, ANSA, IRNA, PAP, APS and ATA. CNA also exchanges news with the Macedonian Press Agency (Thessaloniki), BTA, STA, KYODO and ROMPRES.

== History ==
The Cyprus News Agency was officially established on February 16, 1976 at the initiative of the then Director General of the Cyprus Broadcasting Corporation (CyBC) Andreas Christofides, who saw the need for a national news agency for Cyprus.

Previously, a private news service under the same name had been set up by Miltiades Christodoulou, in 1957. On his appointment as director of the government Press and Information Office (PIO), he handed over to journalist Christakis Katsambas. The operation closed down in 1967.

With the official launching of CNA, Christofides appointed Andreas Hadjipapas, a journalist working for CyBC and correspondent for UPI and AFP in Cyprus, as chief editor of the Agency. Technical facilities were provided by the PIO, thus enabling Hadjipapas to dispatch a daily news bulletin in English to Reuters and the Non-Aligned News Agencies Pool.

In 1984, CNA expanded its activities, hired journalists and other staff and secured translation and distribution of its dispatches in other languages apart from English.

In 1989, the Cyprus House of Representatives approved legislation providing for the operation of the Cyprus News Agency as a "semi-governmental" news organisation with full editorial independence.

Under the Act, CNA is governed by a seven-member Board of Directors comprising established media professionals. The Board includes representatives of the Cyprus Journalists Union, the Cyprus Newspaper and Magazine Publishers Association, CyBC and the PIO.

In 1996, an important year in the development of CNA, news in Greek was introduced, to meet the needs of the local news media which were proliferating, especially in the electronic field and the CNA home page was created on the Internet.

A landmark in CNA's history is the signing in 1996 of a cooperation agreement with the Athens News Agency (ANA), which provided CNA its first computerised editing system.

At the same time, CNA sought membership in established media organisations and regional associations of news agencies. Thus, it became a member of the Alliance of Mediterranean News Agencies (AMAN), the European Alliance of Press Agencies (EAPA) and the Commonwealth Press Union (CPU).

In June 1998, CNA was elected President of the Alliance of the Mediterranean News Agencies (AMAN) at the Alliance's Seventh General Assembly, held in Limassol. During its tenure as President, CNA hosted in Nicosia, in cooperation with AFP, a technical seminar for the member-agencies of the Alliance (March 1999). In June 2000, CNA was unanimously elected at the Ninth General Assembly to the post of Secretary-General of AMAN, for a three-year period and was re-elected in 2003 for a further three-year term.

In 2002, CNA introduced news in Turkish, a press release service and its own photo service offering local coverage of news events.

Together with the budget for 2004, the Council of Ministers and the House of Representatives approved the re-organisation of CNA and a new organisational chart which is to be implemented fully by the end of 2005, thus allowing a further upgrading of the services offered and the operation of the Agency on a 24-hour basis.

== Services ==
As a national news agency, CNA focuses its attention on events in Cyprus and on developments abroad that have some bearing on Cyprus or are of particular interest to the country. It also covers news in the region and activities of the European Union, the Council of Europe and other multilateral organisations.

Coverage includes developments in the Cyprus issue and the country's accession to the EU, as well as home news, domestic politics, foreign policy, economic and business news, social issues, culture/arts and sports.

CNA has correspondents or stringers in all towns of the island, as well as Brussels and Strasbourg, Athens, Turkey, London, Washington, D.C. and New York City.

CNA transmits daily news items in Greek, English and Turkish to its subscribers at home and abroad. Subscribers include daily and weekly newspapers, radio and television stations, international and national press agencies, international organisations, local public and private institutions, Cyprus embassies and press offices throughout the world, foreign embassies and diplomatic missions in Cyprus, as well as Cypriot and Greek overseas communities and their media (newspapers, radio and TV) mainly in Britain, Australia, the United States of America and Canada.

News items in Turkish are posted on the website for free access and sent by e-mail to the Turkish-Cypriot and Turkish media, as well as to the Turkish-Cypriot political parties.

In addition to the news items distributed throughout the day, CNA also issues a Cyprus press review in Greek and a 24-hours news summary in Greek for overseas subscribers in large Cypriot and Greek communities, as well as a bulletin on activities of Cypriots abroad.

Through agreements with the Athens News Agency (ANA) and the European Pressphoto Agency (EPA), CNA offers subscribers a large selection of photographs covering local and international events. CNA itself offers photographs on Cyprus events.

As from 6 January 2002 CNA offers a Press Release Service, on a subscription basis, offering interested organisations the possibility of distributing verbatim their press releases to the media and other subscribers of the Agency. Through this service, the releases of the Press and Information Office of the Cyprus Government are distributed.

The Agency is planning the introduction of other news services and multimedia services, after implementation of its new organisational chart which will allow an increase of its editorial staff and working hours. These services include news in the format of SMA, MMS, WAP and WEB.
