= European Pressphoto Agency =

International news photo agency

EPA Images
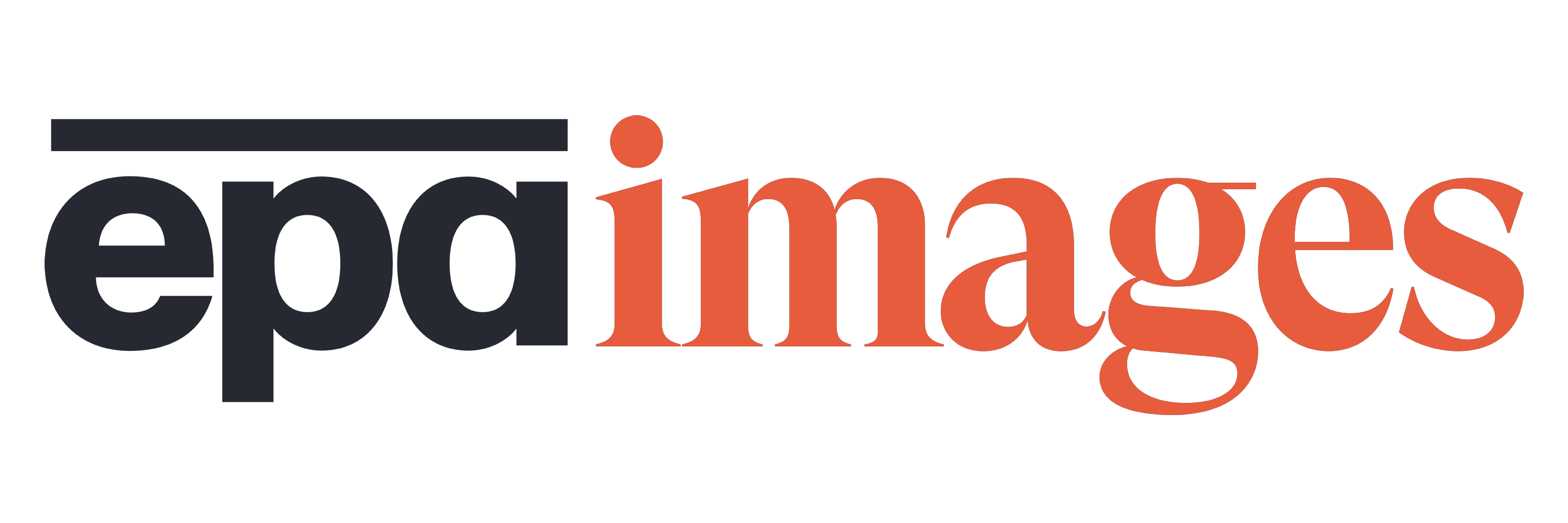
- Type: Dutch private limited liability company (Besloten vennootschap met beperkte aansprakelijkheid)
- Industry: News Agency
- Founded: 1985
- Headquarters: Frankfurt am Main, Germany
- Area served: Worldwide
- Key people: Julia R. Arévalo (President & CEO), Tomas Stargardter (Editor in Chief)
- Products: News Agency, photo archive
- Website: epaimages.com

European Pressphoto Agency B.V. (EPA Images) is an international news and photo agency.

Images from all parts of the world covering news, politics, sports, business, finance as well as arts, culture and entertainment are provided by a global network of over 400 professional photographers and included in the EPA Images service. The EPA Images picture and video service is based both on the broad network of EPA's staff photographers all over the world and on the daily production of its member agencies, which are all market leaders in their respective countries. All photos are edited and distributed to clients and partners worldwide by the editorial headquarters in Frankfurt am Main, Germany, which is staffed 24 hours daily.

== The EPA Images service ==
The international picture service of EPA is used by diverse media as well as EPA's partners and shareholders worldwide. At present EPA's editorial service offers approximately 2,200 new images each day.

== The EPA Images archive ==
The EPA photo archive dates back to 1997 and has over ten million images on stock, the majority of which can be accessed online.

== History ==
EPA Images was founded in 1985 by seven European news agencies. The agencies, AFP of France, ANP of the Netherlands, ANOP (now Lusa) of Portugal, ANSA of Italy, Belga of Belgium, DPA of Germany and EFE of Spain were motivated by what they saw as a lack of alternatives to the Anglo-Saxon picture services offered at the time.

Originally conceived as a vehicle to exchange pictures of the member agencies' domestic service; it also included the world service of AFP and other European services and suppliers. It expanded to a more independent entity as Eastern Europe opened up. The opening of these new markets, along with the war in the former Yugoslavia, led EPA to employ its own photographers in those regions. Despite these developments, EPA remained under the auspices of their member/owners whom it exclusively served.

=== EPA shareholders and EPA going global ===
By 1995 EPA Images had ten members with the additions of Keystone of Switzerland later in 1985, APA of Austria in 1986, and Lehtikuva of Finland in 1987. Pressensbild of Sweden joined in 1997 followed by Scanfoto (later Scanpix Norway) of Norway and Nordfoto (later Scanpix Denmark) of Denmark in 1999. PAP of Poland joined EPA in 2001.

In early 2003, after restructuring and the departure of AFP, EPA expanded into the global market. Later in 2003 Lehtikuva, Scanpix Denmark/Norway and Pressensbild (later Scanpix Sweden) decided not to continue as a shareholder of EPA. However, Scanpix Norway, Sweden and Denmark continued cooperation with EPA under the name of Scanpix Scandinavia.

ANA of Greece (now ANA-MPA) joined EPA as a shareholder in 2004 followed by MTI of Hungary in 2005.

Today EPA has eight shareholders, largely major domestic European news agencies:

- Athens News Agency-Macedonian Press Agency (ANA-MPA) in Greece
- Algemeen Nederlands Persbureau (ANP) in the Netherlands
- Agenzia Nazionale Stampa Associata (ANSA) in Italy
- Agencia EFE in Spain
- Keystone in Switzerland
- Lusa – Agência de Notícias de Portugal in Portugal
- Magyar Távirati Iroda (MTI) in Hungary
- Polska Agencja Prasowa (PAP) in Poland

== Photojournalists ==
Lucas Dolega, an EPA Images photojournalist, was the first journalist to have been killed during the 2010-2011 Tunisian protests and the first journalist to have died during the Arab Spring uprisings.

== See also ==
- Associated Press
- Reuters
- Agence France-Presse
- Getty Images
