= Eana (disambiguation) =

Eana is a genus of moths.

Eana or EANA may also refer to:

- European Alliance of News Agencies, federation of news agencies based in Europe
- Esperanto Association of North America, former name of Esperanto-USA, an Esperanto language association in the United States
- European Astrobiology Network Association, a union of astrobiologists
- Kim Eana, South Korean lyricist
- Eanna (various transliterations), a temple in ancient Uruk to the Sumerian goddess Inanna
