= Mass media in Greece =

The mass media in Greece refers to mass media outlets based in the Hellenic Republic. Television, magazines, and newspapers are all operated by both state-owned and for-profit corporations which depend on advertising, subscription, and other sales-related revenues. The Constitution of Greece guarantees freedom of speech.

Press freedom sharply eroded in Greece during the Greek government-debt crisis, falling from the 35th place in 2009 in Reporters Without Borders Press Freedom Index to the 99th place in 2014, ranked below all Western Balkans countries as well as states with repressive media policies such as Gabon, Kuwait or Liberia. According to a 2015 study by Iosifidis and Boucas, Greece was the EU member state "where journalism and the media faced their most acute crisis".

== Legislative framework ==
Freedom of expression is guaranteed by the Constitution of Greece since the return to civilian rule in 1975. According to Article 14, everyone may express his thoughts orally, in writing and through the press in compliance with the laws. The same article establishes that the press is free, that censorship and the seizure of publications are forbidden, and that the right to reply to errors is also guaranteed. Art.14(9) foresees that media ownership and financing are registered, and prohibits concentration of ownership.

Art.15 states that "protective provisions for the press are not applicable to films, sound recordings, radio, television or any other similar medium for the transmission of speech or images. Radio and television shall be under the direct control of the state. The control and imposition of administrative sanctions are under the exclusive competence of the NCRTV, which is an independent authority, as specified by law.".

The law restricts speech that incites fear, violence and public unrest, as well as publication that are obscene, offending religious belief or calling for violence against the political system. Defamation and insults are crimes punished up to imprisonment.

Access to information is established by the Constitution, and individual access mechanisms are detailed by a 1999 amendment to the Administrative Procedure Code. Access can be restricted for information concerning national security, criminal investigations, and privacy concerns.

The press is regulated first by Law 1092/1938, which includes obligations to respect privacy and separate news from comments, as well as to publish corrections. The press is deemed to respect different opinions and refrain from inciting mass panic.

The public service broadcaster Hellenic Broadcasting Corporation (ERT) is regulated by Law 1730/1987. ERT is mandated to manage and develop state radio and TV, as well as broadcast the activities of the Greek Parliament. It should aim to reach as many social groups as possible and cover many topics to satisfy the public interest.

Commercial radio and TV stations were allowed with the Law 1866/1989, which emerged from the collaborative government between conservatives and communists in the "Catharsis" period in reaction to Koskotas scandal. The state monopoly was finally abolished with Law 2328/1995, which conditions the granting of licenses by NCRTV for commercial channels to whether they would serve a public interest. Commercial channels have quality requirements to maintain their licences. The same Law 1866/1989 sets limits for media ownership, outlawing cross-ownership among the main newspaper publications. Companies are also limited to owning only one TV station, radio station, or electronic media company. The 2007 "Law of the Basic Shareholder" allows acquisition of shares in other media companies if for a minor quota in the company (beyond the 10 first shareholders) and in the market (not beyond 35% of sector market share). Foreign companies are also limited to acquire maximum 25% shares in a Greek media company.

Subscription-based radio and television services are regulated by Law 2644/1998. Terrestrial transmissions require a competitive licensing procedure; licenses are granted only to limited companies (S.A.), whose shares must be registered. Satellite transmissions must anyway submit an application to NCRTV. Licenses are limited to ensure pluralism and prevent dominant market positions. Cross-ownership is limited: "an interested party may only participate in one company that provides subscription-based services using the same means of distribution as well as a second company that uses different means of distribution". The maximum share that an entity can own in a broadcasting media is of 40%. Further provisions on media ownership are included in Law 3592/2007.

The Television Without Frontiers (TVWF) directive was transposed in Greece with the Decree 100/2000. The New Audiovisual Media Service Directive (AVMS) has also been transposed by 2009. TV programmes are classified and labelled according to their potential negative influence on minors.

The state has as traditional strong interventionist role in the media field in Greece, both as a censor (in dictatorship times), an owner (of TV and radio broadcasting channels) and a subsidizer of the media. This has proved fertile ground for patronage politics, with the intertwining of political, economic and sectoral interests, and a culture of self-censorship in journalism.

Deregulation is deemed to have increased the choice menu of viewers, but also to have promoted ownership concentration of press, TV and radio outlets in the hands of few large organisations. At the same time, law in Greece has been ineffective, e.g. in license regulation, leaving the market be dominated by few big interests, which regulatory authorities have proved only superficial and ambivalent in the work.

=== Status and self-regulation of journalists ===
The journalists' job in Greece has been heavily affected by the Greek government-debt crisis. With the decline in advertising revenues and circulation, many media outlets have scaled down or closed. Strikes for unpaid wages have happened more and more often.

The NCRTV issues a Code of Journalist Ethics which is regulatory and mandatory for printed press journalists in Greece. The NCRTV also developed a Code of Conduct for News and Other Political Programs, for broadcast media, in consultation with professional bodies (the National Federation of the Reporters' Associations, advertising agencies, and public and private broadcasters), which was ratified by the Presidential Decree 77/2003. Finally, the NCRTV issued a Code of Ethics on Broadcasting Advertisement. The NCRTV can issue penalties for non-compliance with its codes, up to halting the operations of the broadcasting station for three months.

Other non-mandatory codes of conduct have been developed by unions and professional organisations. In 1988 the five main journalists' unions ratified a Code of Ethics of Greek journalists. The Union of Owners of Daily Newspapers of Athens (AADNP) and the Union of Owners of Regional Newspapers also co-issued a Code of Ethics.

Self-regulation in advertising is contained in the Hellenic Advertising Code, agreed upon by the major media and the advertising industry. The Code establishes a two-tier system for hearing complaints, through a Committee for the Control of Advertisements, and a second-level Joint Committee for the Control of Advertisements.

=== Public service broadcaster ===
Until the Greek government closed the company down on 11 June 2013, the state radio and television broadcasting agency was ERT (Elliniki Radiofonia kai Tileorasi - Greek Radio & Television). The station owned 3 national television stations, ET-1, NET (Nea Elliniki Tileorasi) and ET-3 which was based out of Thessaloniki. In January 2006, ERT launched Digital Terrestrial Television with 3 channels. By March 2006, at least 65% of the Greek population was able to view Digital TV for free with the use of set-top boxes. ERT also operated 7 national radio stations, including ERA 5, the Voice of Greece, which broadcast internationally via shortwave. ERT was based in Athens.

As above, the Greek government announced the closure of ERT on 11 June 2013 with effect from midnight that evening. Since its official closure, employees of ERT have continued broadcasting with their feed being retransmitted online by various websites both inside and outside of Greece notably the CYBC in Cyprus and via the website of the EBU (European Broadcasting Union). The closure of ERT has had political implications in Greece with the smallest party of the Greek coalition government, the Democratic Left withdrawing from government leaving Greece with a New Democracy / PASOK coalition government which has a majority of only three seats.

The closure of ERT left Greece without a broadcaster with national reach, and deprived the country of a voice that, although seen as promoting the government line and having a state-appointed board, also aired opposition views and employed competent and professional journalists. The end of ERT was deemed to damage pluralism in Greek journalism, as ERT was the only broadcaster legally obliged to air unbiased news. The loss of job security for almost 3,000 permanent and temporary employees was a big blow, forcing professional Greek journalists to accept work under deteriorated conditions in private media.

After the closure of ERT, due to its perceived lack of financial transparency, many journalists protested with sit-ins and continued self-managed broadcasts of "ERT OPEN", also in regional facilities, until evicted by police forces. Electricity cuts to the ERT HQ in Rhodes led to a transmitter being taken off air and the facility being looted. ERT OPEN survived for one year based on donations from unions and workers. At the end of 2014, many former ERT employees still had not received severance pay, while others had been disqualified from it or had to face severance cuts.

ERT was later replaced with NERIT, a media with a smaller budget and staff base (around 500), under the control of the government. After the general elections at 25/01/2015 a left party, SYRIZA re-open E.R.T. with all the old staff.

== Media outlets ==
The first non-pirate private radio station to broadcast in Greece was Athena 98.4 FM, in 1987. Private television began in November 1989 when Mega Channel began operating. Today, over 1,000 radio stations and approximately 150 television stations broadcast in Greece. Digital satellite broadcasting began in 1999 by the South-African conglomerate Naspers which uses the trademark Nova.

The Broadcasting Media in Greece was deemed considerably free and fair in 2012. Established state-run and commercial TV networks broadcast nationally and compete actively against each other, and hundreds of thousands of viewers subscribe to satellite pay-TV services. Domestically made variety programmes, comedies and game shows dominate the peak-time TV schedules and are highly popular and widely shown in Greece.

The last licensing tender for the broadcast media was held in 2002 and licenses have since expired. The government has repeatedly issued one-year extensions, notwithstanding a 2011 decision of the Council of State declaring the practice unconstitutional. Many stations rely on "certificates of legality" that are subject to arbitrary revocation.

TV and radio stations operate on the same frequencies as in 1999, notwithstanding interferences from neighbouring countries. Since August 2014, "news station" radios can change into "non-news stations", but not the other way around, giving rise to risk of insulation of the news station market.

Licensing and regulations constitute strong barriers in the media market, particularly for broadcasting, since purchasing an existing station is the only way to enter the market.

Information on media ownership is available to the public, but it is often "veiled" through holding companies and other little-known legal entities. No ownership information is provided for print or online media.

Media ownership concentration in Greece is a growing issue, with cross-media ownership also affecting media independence, due to the economic interests of media owners in other sectors of the economy (particularly shipping and telecommunications). The sector is dominated by six large multimedia companies: Antenna Group, Lambrakis Press Group, Pegasus Press Group, Skai Group, Alpha Media Group, and Vardiniogiannis Group.

Notwithstanding the dire financial conditions of many enterprises in the sector, media have been able to secure loans even during bank recapitalisation and selective lending periods. Mega Channel received a 98 million € loan in 2013.

The placement of state advertising in the media has been pointed as based on political patronage rather than audience size. Political parties also tend to favour favourable media outlets for advertising campaigns (e.g. Syriza's relation with Hot Doc magazine). The 20% tax on advertising revenues for TV stations, introduced in 2010, has never been collected; TV stations were once again exempted in 2014.

=== Print media ===
The main newspapers in Greece are Kathimerini (established 1919, 10,000 copies daily in 2019), To Vima (1922, 44,144 copies in 2010, closed 2011), Ta Nea (1931, 55,014 copies in 2010, 11,000 copies in 2019) and Εleftherotypia (1975, 40,848 copies in 2010, closed 2012).

In 2010 there were 82 national newspapers in Greece, of which 8 morning editions, 13 evening, 22 Sunday and 16 weekly. Sunday newspapers remained the main format, with 56.2% of sales. Most Sunday readers in 2010 chose Proto Thema and To Vima tis Kyriakis (189,389 (50.000 in 2019) and 187,664(35.000 in 2019) copies) followed by Kyriakatiki Eleftherotypia (153,085 copies (closed 2012)).

607 regional/local editions also circulated, of which 65 for Attica. The free press was introduced in Greece in 2000 with Metrorama (later Metro), later followed by City Press.

Introduction of private television in the late 1980s likely led to a decline of newspapers sales throughout the 1990s, from a daily average of 2.6m copies in 1989 to 1.9m in 1992. Most Greek newspapers found themselves in a dire financial situation already in the mid-1990s. The end of the decade brought the system back to stability, with increasing circulation for a pluralistic and critical press, although linked to parties' partisanships. Sunday newspapers brought quality editions to readers. The good period (+26% circulation) went on until around 2005. The 2005–2010 years brought the Greek press back in the state of the early 1990s.

The press market in 2010 in Greece shows a strong concentration of ownership among few publishers: Lambrakis Press S.A., Pegasus Publishing and Printing S.A (Bobolas Publishing Group), Tegopoulos Publishing S.A (Tegopoulos Publishing Group), Kathimerini Publications S.A. (Alafouzos Publishing Group) and Acropolis (Apogevmatini Publishing Group).

Interest- and sector-based magazines also have a strong market in Greece, with around 174 magazines in 2010; glossy publications have to compete with Sunday supplements of newspapers, including popular issues such as To Vima's Vimagazino.

According to 2015 data, the print sector shrunk, due to the fallout of the Greek government-debt crisis. Circulation figures have fallen, and many outlets were forced to shut down, due to reduced advertisement revenues. This also affected employment, with journalists driven to accept lower work conditions and to resort to self-censorship to preserve job security. Major public and private publications showed strong partisan bias. The relations between media owners and political (and governmental) officers had a cooling effect on the presence of critical commentaries in the press. Examples of new models of journalism included the Editors' Newspaper (Efimerida ton Syntakton), the magazine Unfollow, such as the online Press Project and Parallaxi. Online news portals include also in.gr, TV Without Borders (tvxs.gr) and The Press Project. Internet has grown in prominence, yet it also has been indicated as a source of low-quality journalism and dependence on big-firm advertisement.

=== Publishing ===
The Greek publishing industry mainly features small and medium enterprises, often family-based, and mostly founded after the democratisation in 1974, with very little agglomeration among them. Publishing companies active on the Greek market were 374 in 1990 and grew to 841 in 2008. Most of them were based in Athens (82%), 11% in Thessaloniki, and only 7% elsewhere. The market is quite concentrated: 23% of companies published 81% of books in 2008. Only one publishing company is listed at the Athens Stock Exchange. Most of the production is outsourced. Book selling is done through networks of small and medium distributors, selling different publishers' books through companies salespeople. Book prices are set by the publishers, and since 1998 retailers are compelled by law not to sell at more than 10% discount for the first two years, nor to add more than a 5% surcharge. Average paperback book prices reached 17,00 euros in 2007/2008. VAT on books is of 4.5%, compared to 9% and 19% on other products.

The publishing industry doubled the number of published titles in the 1990s, arriving at a total sale in 2004 of 569.7 million euros. Since then, the market came at an approximate number of 9,500 new titles yearly in 2005–08, of which around 2,000 in humanities and social sciences. These numbers have shrunk since the Greek government-debt crisis.

The 10 leading Greek publishing companies in 2008 included Patakis (346 titles), Modern Times (343 titles), Lambrakis Press (268 titles), Minoas (211 titles), Metaichmio (204 titles), Livanis (193 titles), Savalas (191 titles), Kastaniotis (185 titles), Kedros (180 titles), and Psichogios (146 titles). Other important Greek publishing companies are Ellinika Grammata (2007: 295 titles) and A.N. Sakkoulas (2007: 226 titles)

In 2010, bookshops in Greece were more than 2,000, with 3,500 other sales outlets, including magazine retailers and supermarkets. Most of them were in Athens (50%) and in other major centres. The major chainstores were Papasotiriou, Eleftheroudakis, Ianos, Protoporia, Kosmos-Floras, Leader Books, Hellenic Distribution Agency / Newsstand, Fnac, Public.

The Greek Federation of Publishers and Booksellers is member of the International Publishers Association (IPA), the Federation of European Publishers (FEP) and the European Booksellers Federation (EBF).

The main book fair in the country is the International Thessaloniki Book Fair, held every year in April or May and open to the public. It is organised by the National Book Centre of Greece in cooperation with HELEXPO S.A., the Hellenic Federation of Publishers and Booksellers, and the city of Thessaloniki, and has the Greek ministry of culture as its patron.

=== Radio broadcasting ===
The use of radio was widespread in Greece, with 5.02 million receivers in 1997. The public service broadcaster ERT owns five radio stations: Second Programme, ERA-3, NET Radio, ERA Sport, KOSMOS.

Athena 9.84 FM was in 1987 the first non-pirate private radio station in Greece, aired by the Municipality of Athens. In 2010 there were around 1,000 radio stations (56 in Attica) mostly private and with local coverage. 90% of them did not hold an official license, but could be deemed eligible for one. Around 60 Athens radio had been shut down in 2001, allegedly for interfering with frequencies used by the new Athens International Airport, but most of them re-opened in 2002–2005. The licensing process remains inconsistent.

The main channels were the music stations Skai Radio (owned by Alafouzos Publishing Company) with 10.8% and Rythmos (8.4%); the main sports station was Nova Sport FM (7.1%).

The International Hellenic Radio Network, managed by ERT, broadcasts Greek radio abroad. Radio programmes in other languages than Greek are foreseen by e.g. Athens 9.84 and Skai Radio.

A 2007 law requires radio stations to use the Greek language as the main language, as well as to have certain funds in reserve and to employ a minimum number of full-time employees. This creates a disproportionate burden for smaller and municipality-owned radio stations; there is no separate provision for community-based radios, and several student-run radios were subject to attempts by authorities to shut them down in 2014. The 2007 law also allows those radio stations affiliated to political parties represented in the Hellenic Parliament to broadcast without a license. This was extended in 2013 by a NCRTV decision to Art TV, owned by LAOS, that only had European Parliament representation. Art TV remained on air also after LAOS lost European Parliament representation at the 2014 elections. Since August 2014, "news station" radios can change into "non-news stations", but not the other way around, giving rise to risk of insulation of the news station market. Rising utility costs and prohibitive music licensing fees led to many radio stations facing large unpaid debts by the end of 2014.

=== Television broadcasting ===
Television broadcasting in Greece was officially allowed in 1951. Broadcasts started in 1966.

Television was the main means of information for most Greek citizens in 2010, with 3.7 million households with a TV set. The market was de-regulated in 1989 with the end of state monopoly and the creation of private television stations, that now dominate the market.

The public service broadcasters are ERT and Vouli TV (dedicated to Parliament debates). Eight national TV stations are licensed: 902 Aristera sta FM, Alpha TV, Alter Channel, ANT1, Mega Channel, Skai TV, Star Channel, Makedonia TV. The three licensed local/regional TVs are Tileasti, Tiletora and the Municipal Channel of Thessaloniki. Other 123 had applied for a license in 2010.

Satellite broadcasting channels include the public ERT-World and Vouli TV and the private Antenna-Sat, Mega Cosmos, Alpha Without Frontiers, Star International, Teleasty, Alter Globe, Channel 10, Mad International and Extra 3. Foreign satellite channels are broadcast by ERT for free, including CNN International, Cyprus Sat, RIK 1. The Hellas-Sat 2 satellites allows to re-broadcast programmes to Europe, the Middle East and South Africa.

In 2010, the TV market was led by Mega Channel (22.1 percent audience) and Antenna (16.8%), followed by Alpha TV (15.1 percent) and Star (11.4 percent). Public channels have lower viewerships (NET 10.09 percent, ET-3 4 percent and ET-1 3.7 percent). Advertisers likewise favour private channels.

Pay-TV was introduced by Multichoice Hellas with its NOVA bouquet of satellite channels. Poor infrastructure has kept back the development of cable TV (below 1% penetration). Until 1998, only public service broadcasters could lay and operate cable infrastructure. At 8.9%, Greece had the lowest EU rate of cable and satellite TV penetration in 2010.

In 2013 the company Digea (co-owned by Greece's main private TV network) won the tender for a nationwide license to operate Greece's digital television transmitters, also due to the closure of the possible competitor, the public broadcaster ERT. The tender, which was reported as "heavily tailored", created a new monopoly, since Digea is able to collect monthly fees from all TV stations wishing to broadcast digitally, despite a law prohibiting a network provider from being a content provider too.

On September 2, 2016, four national television licenses were auctioned in Greece in a highly unusual competitive bidding process. The licenses were bought by ANT1 TV (Thodoris Kyriakou) for €75.9m, Alter Ego (Evangelos Marinakis) for €73.9m, Ioannis-Vladimiros Kalogritsas for 52.6m and SKAI TV (Iannis Alafouzos) for €43.6m.

Main television stations in Greece

- Public: ERT1, ERT2, ERT3, ERT HD (Hellenic Broadcasting Corporation).
- Private: Mega Channel, ANT1 TV, Star Channel, Alpha TV, Open TV, Skai TV, Makedonia TV.

=== Cinema ===
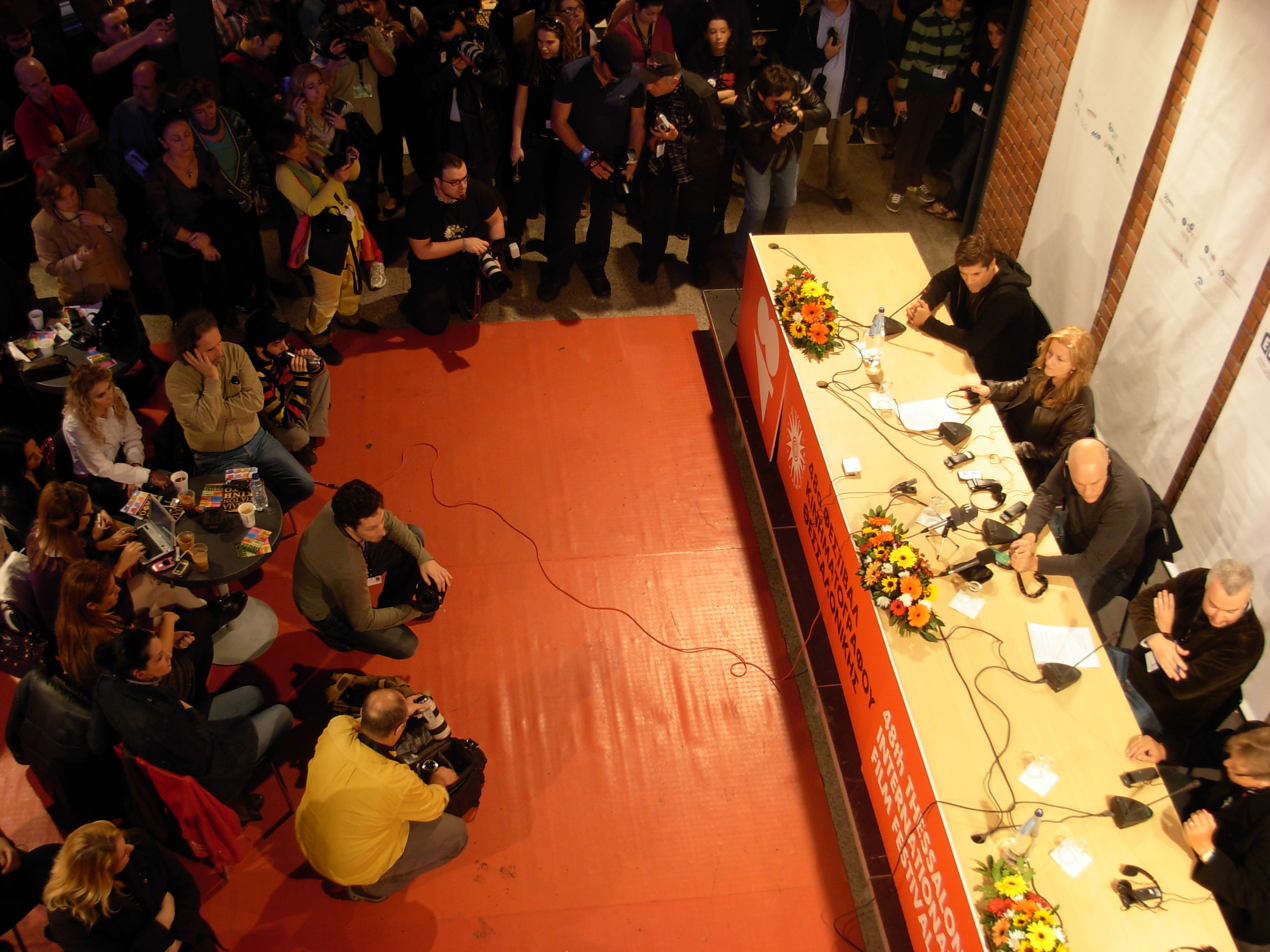
Press conference at the Thessaloniki International Film Festival

Cinema first appeared in Greece in 1896 but the first actual cine-theatre was opened in 1907. In 1914 the Asty Films Company was founded and the production of long films begun. Golfo (Γκόλφω), a well known traditional love story, is the first Greek long movie, although there were several minor productions such as newscasts before this. In 1931, Orestis Laskos directed Daphnis and Chloe (Δάφνις και Χλόη), contained the first nude scene in the history of European cinema; it was also the first Greek movie which was played abroad. In 1944 Katina Paxinou was honoured with the Best Supporting Actress Academy Award for For Whom the Bell Tolls.

The 1950s and early 1960s are considered by many as the Greek Golden age of Cinema. Directors and actors of this era were recognized as important historical figures in Greece and some gained international acclaim: Michael Cacoyannis, Alekos Sakellarios, Melina Mercouri, Nikos Tsiforos, Iakovos Kambanelis, Katina Paxinou, Nikos Koundouros, Ellie Lambeti, Irene Papas etc. More than sixty films per year were made, with the majority having film noir elements. Notable films were Η κάλπικη λίρα (1955 directed by Giorgos Tzavellas), Πικρό Ψωμί (1951, directed by Grigoris Grigoriou), O Drakos (1956 directed by Nikos Koundouros), Stella (1955 directed by Cacoyannis and written by Kampanellis). Cacoyannis also directed Zorba the Greek with Anthony Quinn which received Best Director, Best Adapted Screenplay and Best Film nominations. Finos Film also contributed to this period with movies such as Λατέρνα, Φτώχεια και Φιλότιμο, Η Θεία από το Σικάγο, Το ξύλο βγήκε από τον Παράδεισο and many more. During the 1970s and 1980s Theo Angelopoulos directed a series of notable and appreciated movies. His film Eternity and a Day won the Palme d'Or and the Prize of the Ecumenical Jury at the 1998 Cannes Film Festival.

There were also internationally renowned filmmakers in the Greek diaspora such as the Greek-American Elia Kazan.

The Greek Film Centre recorded 13 fiction films and 14 documentaries shot in Greece in 2008. In 2007, 274 cinemas were registered in Greece, and in 2008 38.5 percent of Greeks went to cinema at least once.

=== Telecommunications ===
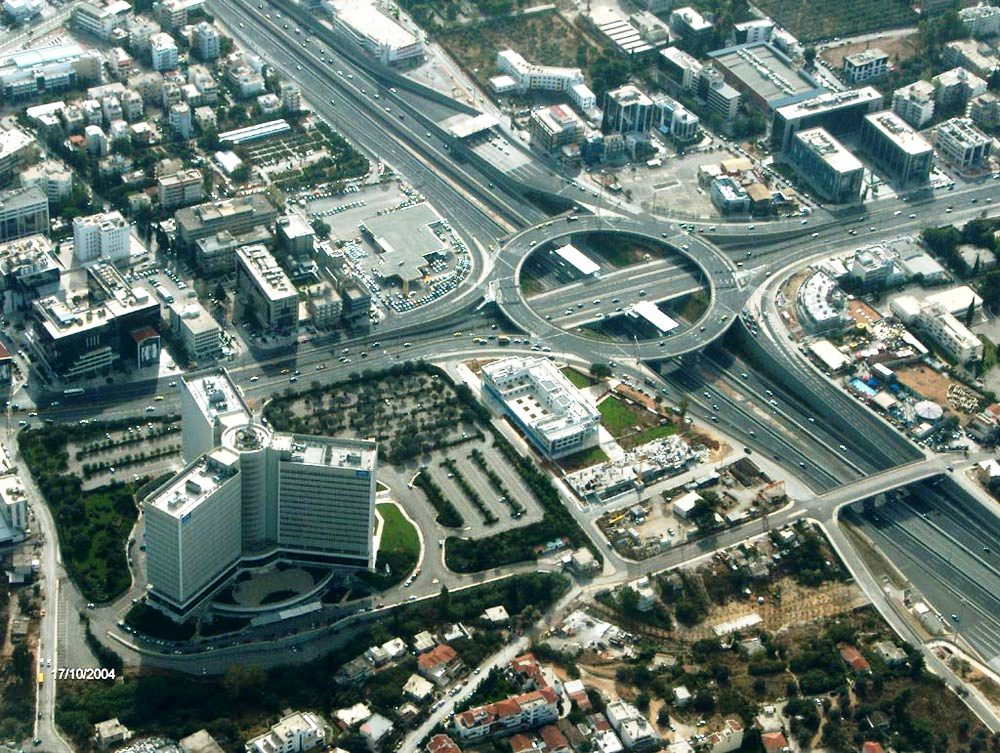
OTE headquarters in Athens

The telecommunications and postal services market in Greece is regulated by the Hellenic Telecommunications and Post Commission (EETT), which issuing official licences to service providers.

OTE, the former state monopoly until 1994, is the main player in fixed line telephony. Since the liberalization of the telecommunications market, OTE has been slowly losing market share to competing telecom operators, such as hellas online, Wind, Cyta, Forthnet and Tilefonia. As of 2005, OTE's share on the market hovered around 76%. Land lines in use were 6,348,800 in 2004.

Greece has three mobile telecom companies; Cosmote (state-owned), Vodafone, WIND and CYTA. Active mobile lines were 20,285,000 in September 2009, which means 180% penetration.

Greece owns one telecommunications satellite, named Hellas-sat, which provides telecommunication services in a major part of Eastern Europe and Western Asia.

=== Internet ===
The Internet in Greece relied on PSTN/ISDN modem dial-up from 1990 until 2003, when ADSL was commercially launched by incumbent operator OTE. ADSL2+ and VDSL2 is currently the main broadband standard. Greece also has 3G and 4G+ mobile broadband (HSPA) and a more expensive Satellite Internet access. Greece has an extensive fiber optic network throughout the country.

63% of the Greek population regularly accessed the internet in 2014 and which in 2019 has increased to just over 70%.

== Media Organisations ==
=== News agencies ===
Greece's public news agency is the Athens-Macedonian News Agency (AMNA), created in 2006 by the merger of Athens News Agency (ANA, est. 1895) with the Macedonian Press Agency (MPA, est. 1991). In 2010 AMNA had 250 employees, of which 180 journalists, and it publishes items in Greek, English and French. Other news agencies include regional ones (Cretian News Agency, Aegean News), sport-focused (Sport Idea, Action image), religion (The Religious News Network), agriculture (Agronews Agency), Greek diaspora (Hellenic World, Greek American news agency, Diaspora News Agency etc.), photography (Inke photography agency, EPA photography agency).

=== Trade unions ===
Trade unions among journalists are widespread in Greece and organised on a regional base. They include the Union of Journalists of Daily Newspapers of Athens, the Union of Journalists of Daily Newspapers of Macedonia-Thrace; the Union of Journalists of Daily Newspapers of Peloponissos, Epirus and Islands; the Union of Journalists of Daily Newspapers of Thessaly, Sterea, Evia; and the Union of Journalists of Periodical Press. The Pan Hellenic Confederation of Associations of ERT Personnel represents the public service broadcaster's employees.

Media employers' associations include the Association of Athens Daily Newspaper Publishers, the Association of Daily Provincial Newspaper Publishers, the Association of Regional TV Channels, the Union of Owners of Athenian Private Radio Stations.

Other major industry organisations include: The National Private TV Channels Association, the Hellenic Association of Radio Owners, the Hellenic Radio Technicians Association, the Greek Association of Film Critics and the Association of Greek Film Producers – Directors.

=== Regulatory authorities ===
The main regulatory authority in Greece is the General Secretariat of Information – Communication (formerly the Ministry of Press & Mass Media), which formulates policy and supervises the implementation of legislation in the media sector.

The Greek National Council for Radio and Television (ESR/NCRTV), founded in 1989, is the independent supervisory and regulatory administrative authority of the radio and television market. It consists of seven members – a President, a vice president and five members, which are all appointed by the Greek Parliament. The NCRTV is the main regulator for private and public broadcast media, established by the Law 1866/1989 as an independent authority whose action is only subordinated to the courts. It grants licenses to private radios and TV, and ensures the respect of the law by license-holders. It can impose penalties, up to suspending or cancelling licenses. The last licensing tender was held in 2002 and licenses have since expired. The government has repeatedly issued one-year extensions, notwithstanding a 2011 decision of the Council of State declaring the practice unconstitutional. Many stations rely on "certificates of legality" that are subject to arbitrary revocation. The terms of several NCRTV members, included its president, expired in 2012, but they have remained in their position despite the Council of State's 2013 declaration of unconstitutionality of the status quo. The NCRTV has been accused of lacking impartiality and of uneven implementation of regulations and penalties, based on political affiliations of media outlets.

The TV Audience Research Control Committee (TV ARCC) is the audience measurement authority. It includes representatives from the Union of Hellenic Advertisers, the Union of Hellenic Advertising Agencies, the public broadcaster (ERT), the major commercial broadcasters and the Association of Hellenic Market and Opinion Research Companies.

The Assembly of Viewers and Listeners (ASKE) has a consultative role on TV programming and advertising.

The Hellenic Telecommunications and Post Commission (EETT) is the main authority in the telecommunication and postal services field.

The Ministry of Culture is the responsible body for regulating the cinema sector, in collaboration with the Greek Film Centre, aiming to ensure "the protection, support and development of the art of film in Greece" and "the presentation, promulgation and promotion of Greek films both at home and abroad."

Other independent regulatory bodies include the Hellenic Authority for Communication Security and Privacy (ADAE), and the Hellenic Data Protection Authority.

The Greek Self-Regulating Organisation for Internet Content, or Safenet, is a no profit organisation founded in 1999 by the three main Greek ISPs, together with the Greek National Research Network, the Greek Association of Internet Users and a large Greek Consumers Association (Ekpizo). Safenet aims to promote internet self-regulation to combat illegal and offensive Web content, as well as raising awareness about it.

== Media concentration and pluralism ==
=== Overview ===
In Greece, the level of media concentration is high. It affects both the print and broadcasting sectors and has increased in last decades together with the emergence of cross-ownership problems. The interdependence between political and media elites is considered among the major factors leading to ineffective and contradictory media policies and poor implementation of anti-corruption rules.

The Greek media landscape changed significantly after the deregulation process affecting the broadcasting sector in the late 1980s. Until the 1980s, the media landscape was dominated by the monopoly of public broadcaster (ERT) while private owners of publishing firms had their business activities limited to this sector (i.e. newspaper, periodical printing and publishing). This situation changed in the 1980s with the entrance in the media market of new investors and big industrials and led to a transformation of ownership patterns. During this transition, the owners of some renowned newspapers (Akropolis, Kathimerini, etc.), unable to implement modernization programs were forced to sell their activities. At the same time, new editorial projects were launched by entrepreneurs whose activities extended also in other sectors. This process went together with the increase of business opportunities in the information sector.

The process of deregulation of broadcasting and radio sectors happened in a legal void which provided opportunities to media owners to grab television and radio frequencies and to initiate broadcasting without licenses.

Media market concentration in terms of market concentration was a consequence of the diversification of newspaper publishers in the field of television, which happened in a poorly regulated and hardly transparent media environment. Private TV expanded rapidly, without embracing a pluralistic profile.

The internet and digital information services have become more increasingly relevant in the Greek media landscape, in particular among young people. This, in principle, offered the potentials for more pluralism in the news offer and variety, yet, such services have often offered low-quality information, gossip, copy-and-paste news and dependence on big firms for advertisements. However, despite these problems, Internet is beginning to host also alternative voices, independent and quality journalism.

The re-opening of the Greek public broadcaster, the ERT SA in 2015, after a two-year closure, was considered a positive step towards pluralism.

=== Media ownership concentration ===
In Greece, the "levels of concentration of media ownership and cross-media concentration are high". The main reason for this lies in the diversification and deregulation process which led several newspaper groups to invest in electronic media. This happened in a poorly regulated media environment.

As for the print sector, the three largest press groups - Lambrakis Press SA (DOL), Tegopoulos Publishing, and Pegasus SA (Bobolas family) - are also shareholders in the main terrestrial channel MEGA. Press Institution SA holds shares in terrestrial channel STAR, and the Alafouzos family owns terrestrial channel SKAI and several radio stations. The rise of the Internet has added a concentration problem as the highest-visited websites include those of the mainstream publishing groups like DOL, Pegasus and also MEGA channel. In the last decade, the problem of media concentration worsened significantly., as demonstrated by the following data: in 2008 the four leading publishing houses controlled 69.7% of the market compared to 57.3% in 2000, 62.9% in 1995 and 59% in 1990. The publishers of such outlets adopted a diversification strategy, leading to investment into other sectors and industries.

As for the broadcasting sector, after the deregulation process of the late 1980s, the number of private television stations increased significantly. However, despite the large number of media outlets, the media scene is dominated by five private channels (MEGA, Ant1, Alpha, Star and Alter) belonging to conglomerates with activities also in other sectors.

Concerning the regulation of media concentration, the relevant law, i.e. Law 2328/1995 did not prevent high levels of concentration, whereas the more recent Law 3592/2007 named "New Act on concentration and Licensing of Media Undertakings" provided more opportunities for deregulation and market liberalisation by abolishing some older regulations. A 2014 amendment to the above Law further relaxed ownership and cross-media ownership requirements by allowing partnerships between electronic media businesses of the same type (television, online, or radio) if this results in a cut of operating costs (through economies of scale or joint utilization of financial resources). This is an indicator of the government's intention to create large media conglomerates for economic viability.

=== Cross-ownership ===
Another problem affecting the Greek media system is cross-ownership. Anti-concentration rules and restrictions were never enforced. According to some experts, governments preferred to satisfy the interest of media owners aspiring to boost their position and power in the media communication landscape emerged after the dismissal of state monopoly, instead of regulating the system. Furthermore, political instability in the years 1989-1990 created the conditions for media owners to exercise pressure on the government. This led to the creation of a powerful oligopoly, constructed around a small number of media corporations owning national dailies, radio and TV stations, several magazines and publishing houses and involved also in the fields of new media, telecommunications and culture.

The problem of cross-ownership, as well as media concentration and instrumentalization of the media have become highly important in Greece to the point to dominate the public and political debate in the country.

== Transparency of media ownership ==
Transparency of media ownership refers to the public availability of accurate, comprehensive and up-to-date information about media ownership structures. A legal regime guaranteeing transparency of media ownership makes possible for the public as well as for media authorities to find out who effectively owns, controls and influences the media as well as media influence on political parties or state bodies.

=== Legal framework ===
The Greek Constitution, under Article No. 14 (9), affirms the importance of transparency and pluralism in the media sector. Also, the Constitution affirms that the law "may specify that the means of financing newspapers and periodicals should be disclosed" In recent years a number of measures have been undertaken to increase transparency of the media. For instance, the Secretariat-General of Mass Media, a governmental body, monitors the allocation of state subsidies and other support measures addressed to the media, including public sector advertising and press distribution and telecommunications subsidies. Specifically, the Secretariat makes public through its website: approved programs and accounts of the advertising expenditure of public bodies; data on procurement of all services related to the supply of goods and services; information on government grants to the press; names of staff employed at the Secretariat for each directorates and departments. However, such information is not always comprehensive and updated.

As for electronic media, the broadcast regulator, namely the National Council on Radio and Television (NCRTV) makes public all radio and TV's licenses through its website. The information published includes the name of the company, contact details, and the scope of the media outlet's territorial coverage. However, a comprehensive legislative framework for transparency of online media has not been established yet. The regulator is also responsible for collecting and keeping records and shareholders information on media outlets and media-related enterprises, such as press agencies, advertising, etc. All these data are publicly available and accessible to the public.

Article 6 of the Presidential Decree 109/2010 which incorporated the EU Audio-visual Media Services Directive sets forth rules for enhancing transparency in the audiovisual sector by obliging providers to make public information such as company name, address, contact details, etc. Also, press enterprises are required to disclose the names of their owners, publisher and managers in their editions. In order to obtain the license to broadcast, radio and TV stations must submit to the NCRT a declaration on their shareholdings. Any transfer of ownership above 1% of the capital of a TV or radio station has to be notified to, and approved by, the NCRT. The role of owner, partner, main shareholder or management executive of a media outlet is not compatible with the role of owner, partner, main shareholder or management executive of an enterprise working for the public sector.

Moreover, there is no independent financial supervision of the public-service broadcasters. Their financial status is problematic.

The principle of transparency in all areas of public life, including media, is expected to be enhanced given that there is an Action Plan Promoting Open Government since 2014 (Greek Action Plan 2014-16). Technical and institutional changes have been adopted to enhance the principle of transparency and these should lead to the enhancement of the functionality of the DIAVGEIA project (Transparency Program Initiative), to the publication of public procurements and to the open, transparent and secure exchange of public documents. The DIAVGEIA project began on October 1, 2010. Under this Transparency Program Initiative, all government institutions are obliged to upload their acts and decisions on the Internet with special attention to issues of national security and sensitive personal data. Each document is digitally signed and assigned a unique Internet Uploading Number (IUN) certifying that the decision has been uploaded at the "Transparency Portal". Following the latest legislative initiative (Law 4210/2013) of the Ministry of Administrative Reform and e-Governance, administrative acts and decisions are not valid unless published online.

== Censorship and media freedom ==
Censorship on Greek media has a long history with roots in the various right-wing dictatorships, established in Greece during the 20th century, with most recent the Greek military junta which ended in 1974.

Nowadays, the Greek Constitution provides for freedom of speech and press, under Article 14. Independent media are active and express a wide variety of views. The law permits any prosecutor to order the seizure of publications that insult the president, offend any religion, contain obscenity, advocate for the violent overthrow of the political system, or disclose military secrets. The law provides criminal penalties for defamation, however, in most criminal defamation cases, authorities released defendants on bail pending trial and they served no time in jail. Both the Greek Constitution and Greek legislation prohibit arbitrary interference with privacy, family, home, or correspondence. However, NGOs such as the Greek Helsinki Monitor report that authorities do not always respect these provisions in practice.

Press freedom sharply eroded in Greece during the Greek government-debt crisis, passing from the 35th place in 2009 in Reporters Without Borders World Press Freedom Index to the 99th place in 2014, well below all Western Balkans countries as well as states with repressive media policies such as Gabon, Kuwait or Liberia. Greece is ranked in the 88th place in the 2017 World Press Freedom Index of Reporters Without Borders. Greece is today the EU member state "where journalism and the media face their most acute crisis".

The crisis has laid bare the unsustainability of Greek media, and the dependence of media owners on state support in terms of tax breaks and public advertisement revenues, and reciprocating by publishing favourable stories, in a self-censorship mode. When public funds dried up, media went bankrupt, while the government resorted to more open tactics of media manipulation via coercion, censorship, and shutdowns. Lack of job security for journalists have driven them to self-censorship too, limiting themselves to stories understood to be acceptable to owners and politicians.

=== Legal framework ===
Defamation, insult and slander are criminalized in Greece, respectively under Articles 361-364 of the Greek Criminal Code. Notably, defamation of a corporation is provided by the latter provision. Prosecutions under these provisions can only be initiated upon complaint, but may be conducted ex officio when the offended party is a public official.

Defaming the Head of the State is a crime under art. No. 168 of the Criminal Code; moreover, the Constitution permits seizures of publications offending the Head of the State. Malicious blasphemy is a criminal offence under Art. 198 of the Criminal Code, as well as publicly reviling the Eastern Orthodox Church of Christ or any other religion tolerated in Greece (Article No. 199). The Greek Constitution allows the seizure of publications insulting religions, too.

On December 22, 2015, the Press Law was amended, specifically the so-called "press killer" provisions regarding civil defamation. In the past, such provisions led, among other things, to non-proportionate fees against media outlets and to a consequent climate of self- censorship. The president of the Panhellenic Federation of Journalists’ Unions (POESY) noticed that "huge amounts that the plaintiffs were asking from the journalists were aiming to terrorise them, impose censorship and hinder a free and democratic dialogue on contemporary political issues".

=== Attacks and censorship against journalists ===
In the last years several instances have been reported in which either extremists or security forces have attacked journalist while they were covering newsworthy events. Impunity is too often the norm. The inappropriate use of violence by police forces against journalists has been attributed both to a strategy of silencing and to the lack of competence of police about how to deal with city riots. According to the Hellenic Photojournalists' Union (EFE), only 1 out of 16 incidents of police attacks against photojournalists between 2010 and 2014 resulted in legal consequences. In a 2016 statement, reporters Without Borders condemned impunity for police violence against journalists.

Moreover, the organization advocating for free expression Index on Censorship reports of increasing dangers for journalists reporting on the refugee crisis in Greece.

2013

- Firebombs were thrown on 16 February 2013 outside the homes of several Greek journalists working for Athens News Agency, ERT, Alpha TV and Mega Channel.

2014

- In July 2014, Golden Dawn supporters assaulted two photojournalists at the trial of a Golden Dawn member in Athens
- In June 2014, journalist Tatiana Bolari was attacked by the riot police while covering a protest near the Finance Ministry in Athens. A police officer later received an 8-months suspended sentence for another attack against Bolari in 2011.
- In November 2014 the premises of the Athens Voice weekly were subject to an arson attack, for which an anarchist group claimed responsibility.

2015

- According to prosecutor Aristidis Korreas's work for the 2015 Greek football scandal, which emerged in April 2015, Olympiacos president Evangelos Marinakis repeatedly has threatened Greek journalists, like Giorgos Tambakopoulos, whοm Marinakis slapped in a restaurant, or Nikos Vasilaras, who was fired after an intervention of Marinakis's.
- In December 2015, two foreign photojournalists were physically assaulted on the island of Lesbos while covering the refugee crisis.

2016

- On 4 February 2016 the freelance radio journalist Demitrios Perros was hospitalised with head injuries after being attacked while covering demonstrations. According to reports, nearby riot police units witnessed the event without intervening. The OSCE RFoM called for accountability for the perpetrators.

2017

- On 20 February 2017, two journalists were harassed by far-right wing protesters while reporting for the private station Skai TV live in Thessaloniki, Greece. They were insulted and obstructed from doing their job by members of the so-called "Patriots' Organisation" who were preventing refugee children from attending classes.
- On January 10, 2017, ten policemen raided into the offices of the Parapolitika newspaper and arrested director Panagiotis Tzenos, following a lawsuit filed against them for libel and attempted extortion by Greek defense minister Panos Kammenos.

2018

- In March 2018, journalist Paris Kourzidis testified that he was taken by force from Hilton, Athens, appealed with gun, by Evangelos Marinakis' bodyguards in order to change an article referring to the legal process of the businessman related to the "Noor One" case with the 2.1 heroin tones.

2020

- In May 2020 journalist George Tragas stated that the government of Kyriakos Mitsotakis intervened for him to be fired by the radio station he was working and that "Maximos Mansion doesn't want his voice and opinions to be communicated".
- In December, journalist Elena Akrita resigned from the daily newspaper Ta Nea when the direction of the newspaper decided to not publish an article by her, criticizing the Mitsotakis government.

2021

- On April 9, 2021 journalist Giorgos Karaivaz was assassinated outside his home.

Index on Censorship curates the Mapping Media Freedom project- a database identifying threats, violations and limitations faced by members of the press throughout European Union member states, candidates for entry and neighbouring countries- where threats on Greek journalists and foreign journalists in Greece are regularly monitored.

Reporters Without Borders signaled negatively the attempt to meddle in DOL, one of Greece's most prominent newspaper groups, by appointing a former SYRIZA MP in charge for its rescue.

=== Political interferences ===
Political interferences in the media sphere in Greece often happen through judicial ruling, themselves deemed to be politically motivated or influenced. In May 2014 the Council of State declared the constitutionality of ERT 2013 closure, notwithstanding procedural irregularities. Lower courts' rulings invalidating dismissals were not enforced by the government in 2014.

Political influence in the Greek media has been on the rise in 2014. The set-up of ERT's successor, NERIT, was marked by scandals and irregularities, including the undue involvement of the Minister of State. An August 2014 law stripped NERIT of its administrative independence and entrusted the government with the power to name its supervisory body, which in turn selects the public broadcaster's president. This was deprecated by the European Broadcasting Union, resulting in complications in NERIT's membership application.

NERIT has been accused repeatedly of political bias, including after blocking the airing of Syriza opposition leader Alexis Tsipras at the Thessaloniki International Fair, while giving ample space to Antonis Samaras' campaign. Several NERIT officials later resigned, citing widespread governmental interference. Hiring scandals and preferential legal treatment from the authorities complete the framework.

Audience shares of NERIT never approached those of ERT, being limited to 5% of viewers. According to former ERT employee Nicos Tsibidas, this left Greece with "a stern state broadcaster", controlled by the government, and "private media oligarchs".

Private channels also presented partisan bias, particularly pro-governmental. ANT1 TV featured reports warning citizens about the negative consequences of not voting for the governmental coalition.

- In February 2014 a court attempted to prevent Mega TV from airing information about a shipwreck in Farmakonisi leading to the death of uncounted migrants, officially to preserve the integrity of ongoing investigations.
- In April 2014, the government was reported to have intervened to change the words from an Athens News Agency wire about Angela Merkel's visit, replacing the term "austerity measures" with "consolidation measures".
- On 30 August 2016, the Greek Government launched an auction for four of the eight private national television broadcasting licenses. Such auction came together with a recent law which reduces to four the number of national television licenses issued to private broadcasters. The auction was to lead to the closure of the relevant four televisions, including some of the largest television operators in Greece. Such process that was soon afterwards deemed unconstitutional by the Greek High Court.

=== Lawsuits against media workers ===
Politicians and other actors launched several proceedings and lawsuits against journalists and media workers, especially after the beginning of the Greek government-debt crisis and using defamation charges.

- The Greek journalist Kostas Vaxevanis was twice arrested, tried and threatened with jail sentences for violating personal privacy laws while publishing the "Lagarde List" of more than 2,000 alleged Greek tax evaders with Swiss bank accounts. He was twice acquitted, the last time in November 2013. Vaxevanis was tried and acquitted again in 2015-16 for defaming a prominent Greek businessman. Currently, he was detained on April 10, 2017- after voluntarily at the police station in Athens. The previous day, he published an article on the wife of the Governor of Greece's central bank, who allegedly took advantages in some public tenders.
  - Greek journalist Stratis Balaskas was sentenced under Article No. 361 of the Greek Criminal Code (criminal defamation) to a fee of €1,603, allowing him to escape prison time. After a series of incidents where the headmaster of a high school in the Lesvos island appeared to support ideas of the extreme right-wing Golden Dawn party, Balaskas wrote an article referring to him as a "Golden Dawn … and neo-Nazi headmaster".
  - The case Koutsoliontos v. Greece (2015) before the European Court of Human Rights concerns the convictions of Mr. Koutsoliontos and Mr. Pantazis for malicious defamation and insult as a result of the publication of a press article which, according to the Greek courts, had breached a politician's honor and reputation. The Court found that the journalists’ conviction did not meet any "pressing social need" and there were not relevant and sufficient reasons to justify the applicants’ conviction to pay civil damages for insult and defamation.
  - Since June 2000, journalist Dimitris Hortargias wrote a series of articles regarding the prosecution of a local sales representative for illegal money lending. In May 2006, the sale representative filed a defamation civil sue against Hortargias and his editor asking €3 million in compensation. Together with the legal expenses, Hortargias had to pay €30,000. Hortagias itself said this issue led him to forms of self-censorship. After becoming President of the Journalistic Union, he fought against the civil defamation provisions in the Greek Press Law and his campaign led to the amendment of such provision in December 2015.
- Journalist Popi Christodoulidou was investigated for publishing "sensitive information" after a blog post on the country's coast guard, although she claimed to have published only publicly available information.
- The Council of State upheld a fine against Alpha TV for a satirical program which was found too "extreme" and thus not protected by the Constitution.

There are no government restrictions on access to the Internet or reports that the government monitors e-mail or Internet chat rooms without appropriate legal authority.

- On June 29, 2009, Georgios Sanidas, the soon-to-be-retired Prosecutor of the Greek Supreme Court (Areios Pagos), declared that "Internet-based communications are not covered by current privacy laws" and are thus open to surveillance by the police. Such surveillance would be, according to Sanidas's mandate, completely legal. Following this proclamation, Greek bloggers, legal experts and notable personalities from the media have claimed that Sanidas's mandate contravenes both the Greek constitution and current EU laws regarding the privacy of Internet communications. Furthermore, this mandate has been greatly criticised as being a first step towards full censorship of all Internet content.
- On August 6, 2009, the most-visited Greek blog (troktiko.blogspot.com) was shut down. Although Google cites potential violations of the terms of use, comments implying other reasons behind the closure of troktiko were published in several leading Greek blogs. The blog went back on-line a few months later and suspended its activities in July 2010, after the assassination of Sokratis Giolias, its administrator.
- In September 2012 the cyber-crime police arrested a 27-year-old man, charging him with "malicious blasphemy and insulting religion". The man reportedly created a Facebook page under the name "Elder Pastitsios" that played on the name of a legendary Mount Athos monk famous for his prophecies about Greece and Orthodox Christianity. The cyber-crime police seized the man's laptop and removed the Facebook page.

On January 16, 2014, the creator of the original "Elder Pastitsios" website was found guilty of "repeatedly insulting religion" and was sentenced to ten months in jail, suspended while the prosecutor had recommended a smaller sentence.

== See also ==
- Internet in Greece
- Open access in Greece to scholarly communication
- Telecommunications in Greece
