= Karel Weirich =

Czech journalist

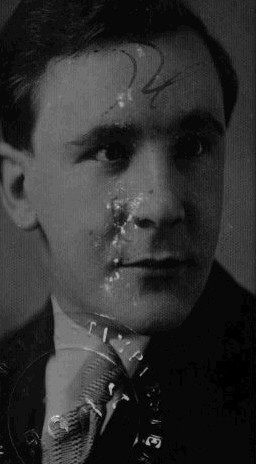
- Born: 2 July 1906; Rome, Kingdom of Italy
- Died: 1 November 1981 (aged 75); Rome, Italy
- Occupation: journalist
- Agent: Resistance in World War II
- Known for: Helping Jews in World War II
- Parent(s): Ignác Weirich, father
- Awards: Medal of Merit, in memoriam (2015)

Karel Weirich (2 July 1906 – 1 November 1981) was a Czech journalist. He worked as a Vatican and Italy correspondent for the Czechoslovak News Agency. During World War II, he saved the lives of five hundred Czechoslovak Jews.

== Life ==
Karel Weirich was born in Rome where his parents moved after his father Ignác Weirich (1856–1916) gained an Italian scholarship as a sculptor and settled in Italy. Weirich spent his childhood mainly in Italy, with the exception of a short stay in Moravia with his parents during World War I.

After completing his secondary education, he started working for Catholic missionary institutions. At first, he was appointed secretary to the director of the Pontifical Society of St. Paul the Apostle, and in 1932, he transferred to the secretariat of the Pontifical Mission Societies. At that time, he started writing articles about the then Czechoslovakia for the Vatican newspaper L'Osservatore Romano, and later also for the Messaggero newspaper. In 1935, he accepted an offer made by the Czechoslovak News Agency to become its permanent correspondent reporting from Italy and the Vatican. In 1941, however, he was dismissed on account of his anti-Nazi views.

After that, he worked as a journalist. He also became a member of a resistance movement—serving as a messenger between Rome, Prague and Paris and in contacts with the Czechoslovak government in London. He started helping foreigners, especially Jews, who were interned by Benito Mussolini in 1940. He helped mainly prisoners held in the Ferramonti di Tarsia concentration camp where several hundred Czechoslovak Jews were imprisoned. They were passengers from the shipwrecked Pentcho ship bound for Palestine. Together with two other Czech compatriots, he founded the Saint Wenceslaus Association, which funded humanitarian aid provided to people hiding from the Nazi in Italy. In April 1944, Weirich was arrested and later sentenced to death. Thanks to the intervention of the Holy See, the death sentence was commuted to 18 years of hard labor. In May 1945, Weirich was freed from the Bavarian prison by US troops.

After the war, he resumed his job for the Czechoslovak News Agency. After February 1948, he was called back to Prague. However, sensing danger, he decided to remain in Italy. After Cardinal Josef Beran's arrival in Rome, Weirich was appointed his second secretary. He was tasked to build Velehrad, a pilgrimage site for Czech pilgrims from around the world. He was also appointed director of Velehrad and he held the post from 1968 to 1981. He died on 1 November 1981.
