= Branka Valentić =

Croatian journalist

Branka Gabriela Vojvodić (born 1968) is a Croatian journalist and former political spokesperson currently serving as the director of HINA, Croatia's nationally-owned news service.

Vojvodić was born in 1968 in Bruchsal, Germany and grew up in Split. She took her surname from her second husband actor Duško Valentić.

She released a personal account of motherhood entitled Dnevnik jedne mame (Diary of a Mother) in 2004.

She was a longtime contributor to the state-owned Vjesnik newspaper until it went out of business in 2012. She also served as spokesperson for the Croatian Party of Pensioners (HSU) until being named director of HINA in late 2012 by the Milanović government of which HSU was a part.
