= Lucas Dolega =

French/German photojournalist

- Born: Loucas von Zabiensky-Mebrouk; 19 August 1978; Paris, France
- Died: 17 January 2011 (aged 32); Tunis, Tunisia
- Cause of death: Tear gas canister
- Other name: Lucas Mebrouk Dolega
- Occupation: Photojournalist
- Years active: 2006–2011
- Employer: European Pressphoto Agency

Lucas Dolega (19 August 1978 – 17 January 2011), born Loucas von Zabiensky-Mebrouk and also called Lucas Mebrouk Dolega, was a French/German photojournalist. He was reportedly killed by Tunisian police while he was photographing a protest in Tunis. As reported in The Guardian, Dolega was the first journalist killed during the 2010-2011 Tunisian protests, according to Reporters Without Borders. He was also the first journalist to die while on assignment during the Arab Spring uprisings.

He was fatally injured on the same day that Zine El Abidine Ben Ali fled Tunisia for exile.

== Personal information ==
Dolega was born in Paris on 19 August 1978 to a German mother and a French father, a journalist and a doctor respectively. He grew up in Paris, before moving to Tangier in Morocco. He had French and German citizenship, and started work as a photographer for European Pressphoto Agency in April 2006. He was based in Paris, covered a variety of stories in Europe, and in 2008 photographed the Congo.

Dolega was 32 years old when he died.

== Death ==
On 14 January 2011, the day after Dolega arrived in Tunis, and at the end of a demonstration on Avenue Bourguiba, he was within a group of journalists at the corner of rue Gandhi and rue de Marseille. He was hit in the head by a tear gas canister, about 20 cm long and 5 cm diameter, reportedly fired by police at short range and horizontally toward a group of photographers. He was taken first to a clinic and then to Tunis Rabta Neurologic Hospital where he was operated on but died on 17 January. Fellow photographer and friend Olivier Laban-Mattei brought Dolega's corpse back to France.

== Impact ==
Dolega was the first of a number of journalists who were killed over the course of the Arab Spring uprisings in 2011. He was killed while on assignment. He is among a group of photojournalists who were killed while covering protests, such as Hiro Muramoto, cameraman and journalist shot by a soldier in Bangkok, 2010; or Kenji Nagai, a photojournalist who was shot by a soldier in Rangoon, 2007.

== Legacy ==
The Lucas Dolega Award (Prix Lucas Dolega) was established in 2011 to honor photojournalists who have reported under difficult circumstances.

== In popular culture ==
Lucas Dolega is mentioned in the poem "A Love Letter from Emilie Blachère to Rémi Ochlik", written by Paris Match journalist Emilie Blachère on the occasion of the first anniversary of Rémi Ochlik's death. She writes: "My angel, give Lucas a kiss for me. Take care of yourself. Take care of us." After she read the poem on BBC Radio 4's Broadcasting House news program, radio host Paddy O'Connell broke down emotionally and could not bring himself to continue the news broadcast for around 12 seconds. Rémi Ochlik was a friend and colleague of Lucas Dolega, he was with Dolega when Dolega died, and he worked on establishing an award in Dolega's honor after his friend's death.
