= Athens News Agency =

The Athens News Agency (ANA; Greek: Αθηναϊκό Πρακτορείο Ειδήσεων) was one of the two major news agencies in Greece, the other being the Macedonian Press Agency, before they merged into the Athens-Macedonian News Agency (AMNA).

== History ==
The Athens News Agency (ANA) is the national news agency of Greece. Founded in 1895 as a private company, the Stefanopoli Telegraphic Agency, the Greek State assumed its subsidisation in 1905, at which time it acquired its present name.

In 1994 the ANA became a Societe Anonyme with a 7-member Board of Directors, three of whom are appointed by the government and one each by the journalist unions of Athens and Thessaloniki, the publishers' union and the ANA employees.

ANA collaborates with the international news agencies Reuters, Agence France-Presse, DPA, TASS and a number of national news agencies, as well as the EPA photograph agency.

All the ANA services are on-line, with an estimated 350 news items in Greek and 60-70 items in English updated daily. It also publishes an English 'Electronic Daily News Bulletin' containing all the Greek news. The ANA further has four data banks in Greek—news, biographies of Greek and foreign personalities, election results and sports—and a news bank in English (since 1992).

The ANA employs about 250 persons, of which 180 are journalists, and has offices in Brussels, Istanbul, Nicosia and Berlin and correspondents in Washington, New York, Montreal, Melbourne, London, Paris, Vienna, Rome, Belgrade, Skopje etc.

ANA's General Director is Ilias Matsikas, a former senior editor with the Athens mass daily "Ta Nea". The managing director is noted Greek journalist and international political analyst Nicolas Voulelis, while the Special English Service (wire service) and the electronic "Daily Bulletin" is headed by H.K. (Harry) Tzanis, a University of Houston journalism school graduate.

== See also ==
- Mass media in Greece
- Athens-Macedonian News Agency
