= Fundéu =

Foundation for the proper use of Spanish

- FundéuRAE
- Formation: February 8, 2005; 20 years ago
- Founder: Agencia EFE; Banco Bilbao Vizcaya Argentaria; Royal Spanish Academy
- Type: Non-profit
- Website: https://www.fundeu.es/

The FundéuRAE (Fundéu, an acronym in Spanish: Fundación del Español Urgente, lit. 'Foundation of Urgent Spanish') is a non-profit organization founded in 2005 in Madrid, Spain. The foundation was created in collaboration with the Royal Spanish Academy (RAE), an institution that standardizes the use of Spanish, and Agencia EFE's Department of Urgent Spanish.

== History ==
The foundation was created in 2004 in collaboration with the Royal Spanish Academy. Chaired by that institution's then-director, Víctor García de la Concha, it took a new name, Fundéu BBVA, in 2008, before returning to its original name, FundéuRAE, in 2020.

== Board of Trustees ==
As of 2020, its board of trustees comprises the director of the Royal Spanish Academy, Santiago Muñoz Machado (chair); the chairwoman of Agencia EFE, Gabriela Cañas (vice-chair); the director of Instituto Cervantes, Luis García Montero, and the academicians José María Merino, Soledad Puértolas and Carme Riera, as well as Álex Grijelmo who, when chairman of EFE, set up the original Fundéu.

== Word of the Year ==
The Word of the Year (Spanish: palabra del año) has been selected since 2013 by the Fundéu in collaboration with the Royal Spanish Academy. Javier Lascurain, Fundéu's subdirector and journalist explained "we are looking for a term that is representative of 2013 from the current point of view, of what has been talked about in the media, and that at the same time has a certain linguistic interest due to its formation, its origin, and its use" and announced a shortlist of twelve words.

Year	Word of the Year	English translation	Rationale
2013	escrache	escrache	In the first months of 2013, escrache was popularized in Spanish media due to the actions of Plataforma de Afectados por la Hipoteca (Spanish for Platform for People Affected by Mortgages).
2014	selfi	selfie	
2015	refugiado	refugee	The armed conflicts in Middle East countries such as Syria, Afghanistan, Iraq and Eritrea created a great influx of refugees fleeing war and persecution into the Schengen Area; the European Union struggled to cope with the crisis.
2016	populismo	populism	A word heavily used that year due to Donald Trump's victory in the 2016 United States presidential election, Brexit and elections in Spain and Latin America.
2017	aporofobia	aporophobia	First coined in the 1990s by Spanish philosopher Adela Cortina, the Senate of Spain approved a motion calling for the inclusion of aporophobia as an aggravating circumstance in the Criminal Code.
2018	microplástico	microplastics	Half of the twelve shortlisted words in 2018 were terms related to the climate change issue and its widespread before Greta Thunberg's School Strike for Climate.
2019	emoji	emoji	
2020	confinamiento	lockdown	2020 was heavily defined by the COVID-19 pandemic, which led to many restrictions in Spain and South America, as in the rest of the world.
2021	vacuna	vaccine	Inmunidad del rebaño (herd immunity) and tripanofobia (aichmophobia) were also on the shortlist, among other terms related to COVID-19 pandemic as negacionista (negationist) or variante (variant). Also, fajana (fajã) was a word widely used in the media due to the eruption of Cumbre Vieja.
2022	inteligencia artificial	artificial intelligence	
2023	polarización	polarization	2023 saw an increase in the use of the word with particular reference to political and social polarization.
2024	dana	DANA, cold drop, or cut-off low	Selected primarily because of significant usage in media surrounding the 2024 Spanish floods. Additionally, because of linguistic interest and Spanish speakers’ questions surrounding how to use the term in writing. The word dana comes from the acronym DANA for depresión aislada en niveles altos (“isolated depression at high levels”) and describes a common Mediterranean weather phenomenon that was responsible for catastrophic flooding in parts of Spain in 2024.
2025	arancel	tariff	
