= Algemeen Nederlands Persbureau =

Dutch news agency

- Industry: News agency
- Founded: 11 December 1934
- Headquarters: The Hague, Netherlands
- Key people: Martijn Bennis (CEO); Freek Staps (Chief Editor); Mark Westerhoff (CTO); Gert-Jan Strik (CFO).
- Products: Wire service, News, Photos, Data, Infographics, Radio, Video, Expert Support, Mediamonitoring, Distribution
- Owner: Chris Oomen
- Number of employees: 250
- Website: ANP.nl

The Algemeen Nederlands Persbureau (ANP) BV is the largest news agency in the Netherlands. ANP was founded on 11 December 1934 by the association of Dutch newspapers (NDP).

== Privatization ==
In 2000, the foundation was transformed into a private company, still owned by the Dutch newspapers (NDP). In 2003 NPM Capital, the private equity firm of the Dutch family owned conglomerate SHV, bought 60% of the shares from the publishers PCM Uitgevers, Telegraaf Media Groep and Wegener. Within a year NPM sold 15% of the shares to the private equity firm Halder, a subsidiary of the investment company GIMV. A minority stake remained in the hands of NDP (30%) and the management (10%). In 2007, NDP sold their full 30% share stake to NPM, Halder and the management.

In 2010 Vereniging Veronica acquired the entire ANP, remaining the owners until they sold it to Talpa Network on 28 March 2018. Shortely thereafter, ANP took over photo agency Hollandse Hoogte. In 2021, Talpa sold the entirety of their stake in ANP to entrepreneur Chris Oomen. In 2021 ANP bought datapressagency LocalFocus. In 2022 ANP launched a new label for its communication services: ANP Business.

== Workings ==
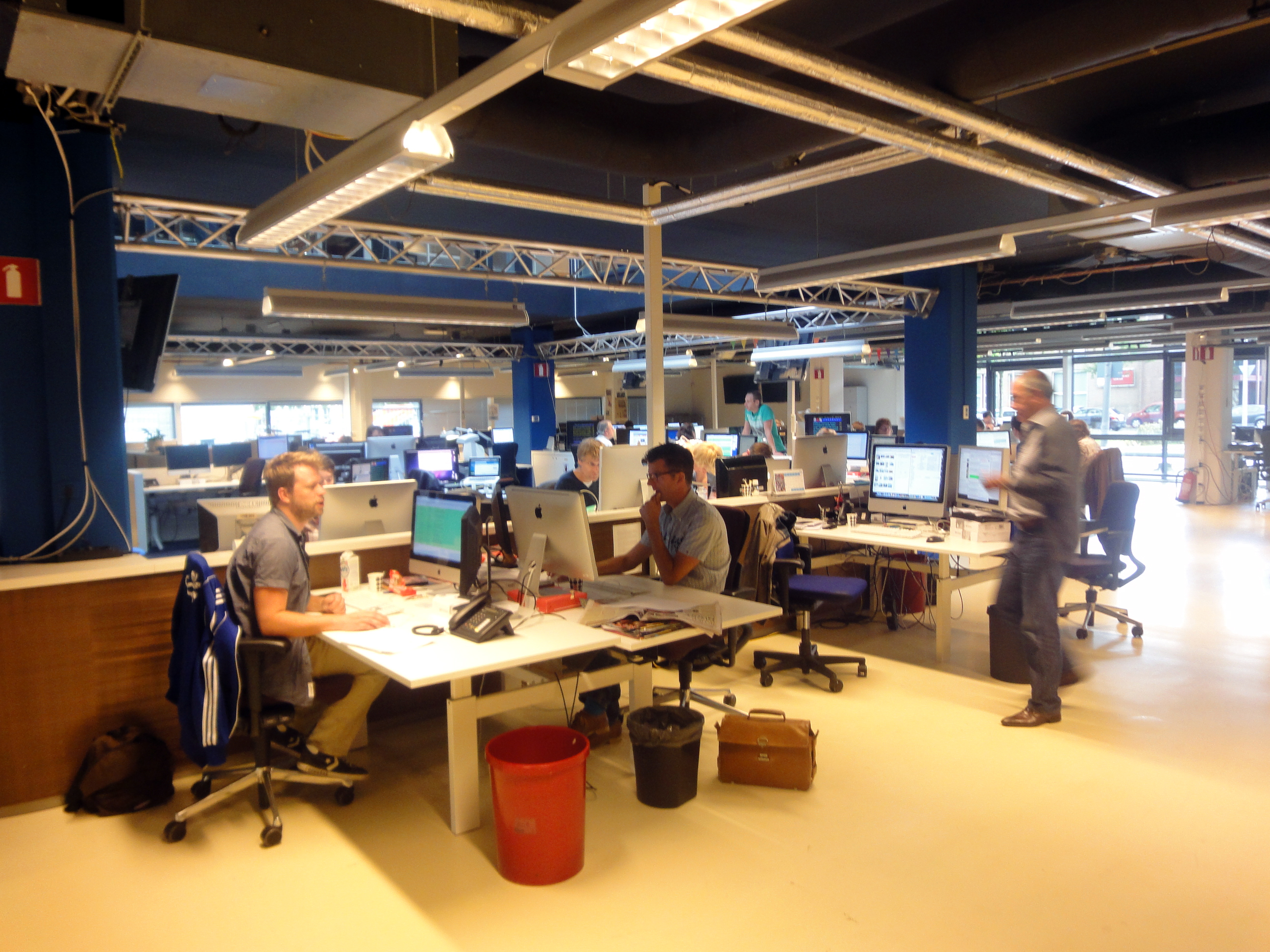
ANP former headquarters in Rijswijk.

With 160 reporters, correspondents, editors and photographers ANP produces over 160.000 news articles a year, accompanied by 600.000 photos. The ANP Multimedia staff airs radio bulletins and edits news for online media and mobile phones. Throughout a network of international correspondents and news agencies ANP delivers foreign news to its customers. The daily production (in Dutch) consists of general, political, financial, sports and entertainment news.

The archives of ANP Photo consist of over 2 million digital images and 2,5 million slides. ANP owns the archives of the former Dutch photoagencies Kippa and Benelux Press.

Apart from the news productions, ANP Business supports non-media organisations with communication, distribution and pr. The ANP Business team operates completely separate from the news agency.

In 2021, management decided to start using gender neutral language.

== Offices ==
The staff of 250 people is headquartered since 2018 in The Hague and has editorial offices in Amsterdam (Economy and City), at Binnenhof in The Hague (National political news) and Brussels (European political news). Until the 1970s, the group was based on the Spuistraat in central Amsterdam.

In the Netherlands, ANP represents the news agencies Agence France-Presse (AFP), Deutsche Presse Agentur (DPA), EFE (Spain) and Belga (Belgium).

== See also ==
- Anefo
- List of news agencies
