= Agency for Information Society of Republika Srpska =

Agency for information society of Republika Srpska
- Agencija za informaciono društvo Republike Srpske; Агенција за информационо друштво Републике Српске; Agencija za informacijsko društvo Republike Srpske

Agency overview
- Agency executive: Srdjan Rajcevic, Director

The Agency for Information Society of Republika Srpska (Note: Bosnian: Agencija za informaciono društvo Republike Srpske; Croatian: Agencija za informacijsko društvo Republike Srpske; Serbian: Agencija za informaciono društvo Republike Srpske, Агенција за информационо друштво Републике Српске) (AIS) is an institution responsible for monitoring the development of information society and promoting the use of information and communication technologies. Supervision of the agency, on behalf of the Republika Srpska, is performed by the Ministry of Science and Technology.

== Establishment ==
Pursuant to the provisions of the law on the government of the Republika Srpska and the law on the Public Service System, the government of the Republika Srpska adopted a decision on the establishment of the Public Institution—the "Information Society Agency of the Republika Srpska"—at its session held on 26 December 2007. With the adoption of this act by the RS government, an institution in charge of monitoring and developing the information society, as well as promoting the use of information-communication technologies, was formed. The Ministry of Science and Technology monitors the operation of the agency, on behalf of the government of the Republika Srpska.

=== Activity ===
The agency tries to coordinate the development of information science, technology, and the internet in cooperation with other bodies in public administration, education, and the health system. It licenses and certifies public key infrastructure bodies, consultancies and provides both IT skills training and assessment for members of the civil service, and promotes equal development by reducing the "technological gap" between Bosnia and Herzegovina and developed countries.

It verifies information and communications technology (ICT) projects in the public sector, primarily in administration and provides advice on international agreements related to ICT (including foreign investments in ICT).

The agency also determines the standards and procedures and issues approvals for the procurement of equipment and program solutions. Accreditation of education and examination centers, in cooperation with the Ministry of Education and Culture, enables certification of citizens in the ICT field through a post-education form and lifelong learning. It is responsible for the development of legislation and the preparation of draft regulations and general acts.

As of 2011, the agency is responsible for the implementation of Information security laws, measures, and standards, as well as the first CERT body in Bosnia and Herzegovina.
