= European Astrobiology Network Association =

Union of astrobiologists

The European Astrobiology Network Association (EANA) coordinates and facilities research expertise in astrobiology in Europe.

EANA was created in 2001 to coordinate the different European centers in astrobiology and the related fields previously organized in paleontology, geology, atmospheric physics, planetary science and stellar physics. In early 2002, EANA was established as an affiliate partner of the NASA Astrobiology Institute.

The association is administered by an Executive Council that is elected every three years and represents the European nations active in the field, as Austria, Belgium, France, Germany, Italy, Portugal, Spain, etc.

The EANA Executive Council is composed of a president, two vice-presidents, a treasurer and two secretaries, and councillors.

The EANA association strongly supports the AbGradE – Astrobiology Graduates in Europe, which is an independent organisation that aim to support early-career scientists and students in astrobiology.

== Objectives ==
The specific objectives of EANA are to:

- bring together active European researchers and link their research programs
- fund exchange visits between laboratories
- optimize the sharing of information and resources facilities for research
- promote this field of research to European funding agencies and politicians
- promote research on extremophiles of relevance to environmental issues in Europe
- interface with the Research Network with European bodies (e.g. European Space Agency, and the European Commission)
- attract young scientists to participate
- promote public interest in astrobiology, and to educate the younger generation
