= Lusa News Agency =

Portuguese news agency

- Native name: Lusa – Agência de Notícias de Portugal, S.A.
- Company type: Public
- Industry: News agency
- Genre: News
- Predecessor: Agência Noticiosa Lusitânia; ANI - Agência Noticiosa de Informação; ANOP - Agência Noticiosa Portuguesa
- Founded: 1986
- Headquarters: Lisbon, Portugal
- Website: www.lusa.pt

The Lusa News Agency (Portuguese: Lusa – Agência de Notícias de Portugal, SA; lit. 'Lusa - Portuguese News Agency') is the largest news agency in Portugal, as well as the largest news agency in the Portuguese language, incorporated on 28 November 1986 under the name of Agência Lusa — Cooperativa de Interesse Público de Responsabilidade Limitada (Lusa Agency – Public Interest Cooperative with Limited Liability) or simply Lusa – CIPRL, following the extinction of the earlier Portuguese news agency ANOP Agência Noticiosa Portuguesa (Portuguese News Agency). Lusa is a member of, and participates in, the European Pressphoto Agency and is an active member of the European Alliance of News Agencies (EANA).

== History ==
The first news agency created in Portugal was the Agência Noticiosa Lusitânia, or simply Lusitânia (named after the Roman Province), created in 1944. In 1947 another agency was created, ANI – Agência Noticiosa de Informação (state news agency information). In 1974, the new regime that ascended power on 25 April wound up the Lusitânia and nationalised the ANI, turning it into ANOP – Agência Noticiosa Portuguesa.

Due to financial difficulties and other problems with ANOP, the government decides to abolish it in 1982, and support the creation of another agency, this time in the private sector, the NP – Notícias de Portugal. However the extinction of ANOP was vetoed by the president and both began to coexist. In 1986, both NP and ANOP were finally wound up and the Lusa agency was created.

Although abolished in December 1986, a decree signed by Prime Minister Aníbal Cavaco Silva and promulgated by President Mario Soares, which determined the "closing by liquidation" of ANOP, was published in the Official Gazette only in March 2014. The last members of the liquidation committee were to return the "excess remunerations" for 2010 and 2011. This was because the 5% cut in salaries in the public and for similar managers, provided by law, also passed in 2010 in the government of José Sócrates had not been applied.

== Operations ==
Lusa has more than 280 journalists working for it, spread throughout the world. In addition to the major cities of Portugal, Lusa has permanent branches or correspondents in Belgium, Spain, Germany, United Kingdom, France, Luxembourg, Russia, Estonia, Guinea-Bissau, Cape Verde, Angola, Mozambique, India, São Tomé and Príncipe, South Africa, Algeria, East Timor, Macau, China, Brazil, Venezuela, United States, Canada and Australia.

Lusa provides a news service to numerous newspapers, radio and Portuguese TV channels. It also provides news to the media of the Portuguese communities throughout the world. Starting on 30 January 2010, Lusa began using the Orthographic Agreement of 1990 in all its news dispatches.

An important activity of the Lusa news service is also to provide news to the news agencies of the Portuguese-speaking African countries, and also share the services of Lusa to various public and private institutions. It is part of the Alliance of Portuguese Language Information Agencies.

=== Awards ===
On 24 September 2010 Lusa was bestowed with the "Award of Excellence and Quality of Work 2010" awarded by the European Alliance of News Agencies (EANA), through its technical director Paulo Nogueira dos Santos. In 2012, Lusa was awarded the insignia of the Order of Timor-Leste by president of East Timor José Ramos-Horta.

=== Company policies and values ===
In its About Us, LUSA stated that "in addition to the public interest, rigor, impartiality, plurality of information, speed, quality and teamwork are the principles that guide the activity and behaviors within the organization". Also, "the principles that guide Lusa's news production are: clarity, accuracy, balance, separation of facts and opinions, plurality, reliability and the timeliness of the information, identification of sources; exemption – autonomy, detachment and independence from the facts and opinions disclosed."

== Shareholders ==
Lusa's stock capital is held by:

Proportion	Shareholders
95.86%	Portuguese state
2.72%	NP-Notícias de Portugal, CRL
1.38%	Público-Comunicação Social, S.A.
0.03%	Radio e Televisão de Portugal, S.A.
0.01%	Diário do Minho
