= Swiss Telegraphic Agency =

National press agency of Switzerland

Keystone-SDA
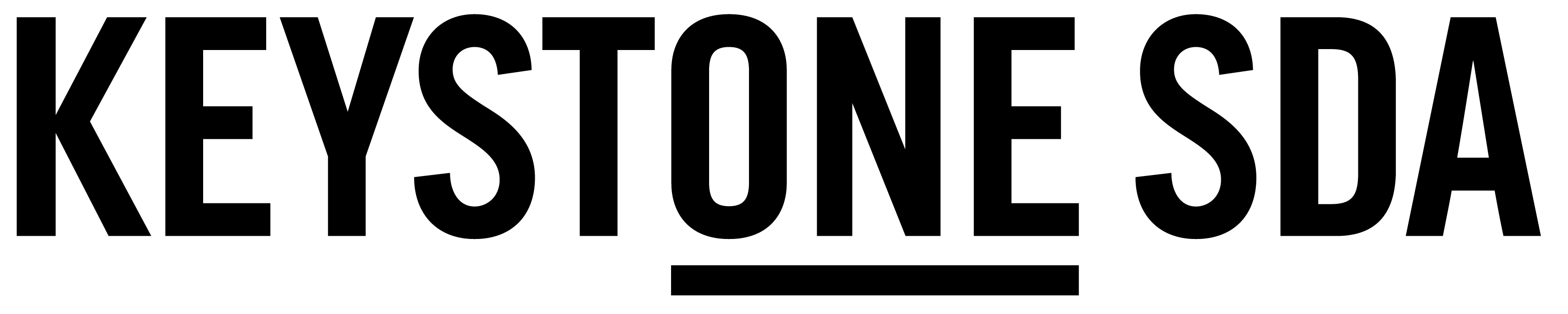
- Formerly: Swiss Telegraphic Agency (pre 2018)
- Industry: News media
- Founded: 1894
- Headquarters: Switzerland
- Website: keystone.sda.ch

The Swiss Telegraphic Agency (German: Schweizerische Depeschenagentur, SDA; French: Agence télégraphique suisse, ATS; Italian: Agenzia telegrafica svizzera, ATS; branded as Keystone-SDA/Keystone-ATS since 27 April 2018) is the national press agency of Switzerland, founded in 1894. In 2017, it merged with the Swiss picture agency Keystone.

The Swiss Telegraphic Agency is a non-profit organization, but is owned privately.
