= Macedonian Press Agency =

The Macedonian Press Agency (MPA; Greek: Μακεδονικό Πρακτορείο Ειδήσεων) was one of the two major news agencies in Greece, the other one being Athens News Agency, before they merged into the Athens News Agency-Macedonian Press Agency (ANA-MPA).

The Macedonian Press Agency offers political, cultural and economic news and information on events taking place in Greece, as well as around the world. Special emphasis is given on issues concerning the Balkans, Eastern Europe and the Black Sea region.
