= Belga News Agency =

Belgian news agency

Coordinates: 50.845404°N 4.399048°E

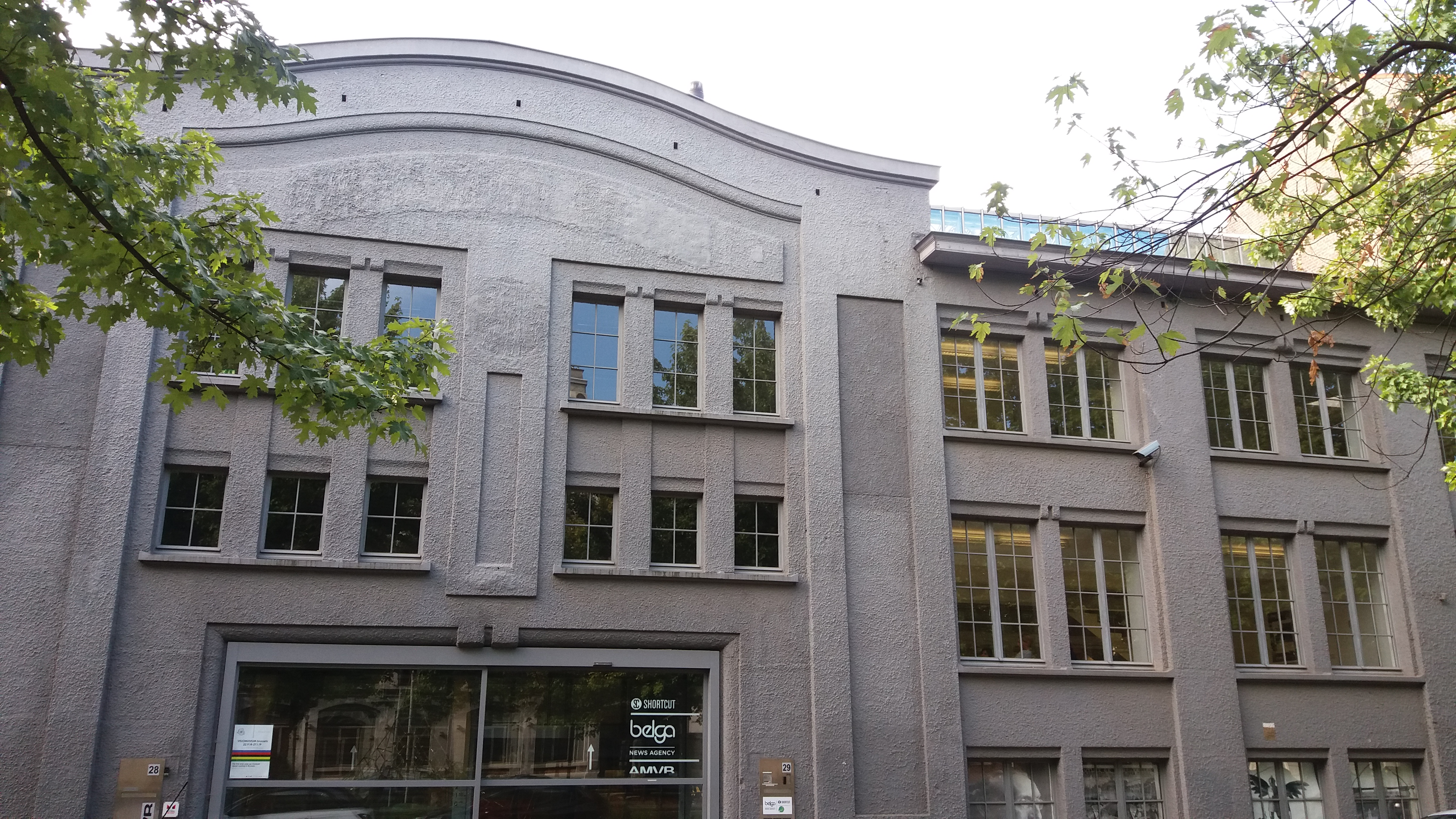
- Headquarters in Brussels
- Type: Société anonyme
- Industry: News agency
- Founded: August 20, 1920
- Founder: Maurice Travailleur
- Headquarters: Quai aux Pierres de Taille / Arduinkaai 28–29, 1000 City of Brussels, Brussels-Capital Region, Belgium
- Key people: Patrick Lacroix (CEO); Hans Vandendriessche (editor-in-chief)
- Website: www.belga.be

Belga News Agency (Note: "Belga News Agency" has been the official name of the agency in both Dutch and French since December 2023.) (abbr. Belga) is the only national news agency of Belgium and serves as the main supplier of daily news to Belgian media. It was founded in 1920, primarily by Maurice Travailleur, as the Société Anonyme Agence Télégraphique Belge. Following a reform in 1970, the agency consists of two independent departments for Dutch and French-language reporting. As of 2024, Belga employs around 80 permanent journalists and 30 local correspondents, overseen by an editor-in-chief. Since December 2014, the agency has been headquartered in the Quays or Sainte-Catherine/Sint-Katelijne Quarter of Brussels. It is an active member of the European Alliance of News Agencies.

== History ==
Founded by engineer Maurice Travailleur (Note: Among the various people involved in Belga's founding, Travailleur is considered by Hoed 1964 to be the "true founder.") with the key involvement of journalist Pierre-Marie Olivier, King Albert I of Belgium, and the king's secretary M. L. Gérard on August 20, 1920, the Société Anonyme Agence Télégraphique Belge (lit. 'Belgian Telegraphic Agency S. A.'; abbreviated to Belga) was established to position Belgium in the international information process after World War I, when its policy of obligatory neutrality had ended. The starting capital amounted to five million francs, almost entirely provided by industrial and banking companies. The agency began functioning on January 1 the next year, with Travailleur serving as the first president of its board of directors. During the Nazi German occupation of Belgium, Belga was shut down, its board and editors-in-chief were arrested, and the agency was restarted by the occupation government in January 1941 as "Belga Press," which almost exclusively sourced information from the Nazi press agency Deutsches Nachrichtenbüro.

Following the Allied liberation of 1944, Travailleur, Antoine Seyl, and a few former staff members reestablished Belga, with operations continuing again on September 5 that year. Also in the same year, Belga began issuing reports in Dutch, previously being an exclusively Francophone agency. Increasing regionalist sentiments in the 1960s provoked a reform of the production process in 1970: two equally-sized departments, one for Dutch and the other for French, would produce content independently of the other within the same newsroom.

== Description ==
=== Structure ===
Belga is the main and only national news agency in Belgium, relying on some 80 permanent journalists working in the two main national languages, as well as on 30 local correspondents, as of 2024. (Note: Verleyen, Beckers & Jacobs 2025 count "[i]n total, 100 journalists" who "work at the Belga press agency") The newsroom is headed by the editor-in-chief (currently Hans Vandendriessche) and divided into two language-based departments, each overseen by their own deputy editor-in-chief. Since January 2016, the CEO of the agency has been Patrick Lacroix.

=== Content ===
Belga provides news coverage 24 hours a day, 7 days a week, both in Belgium and abroad, covering all areas: politics, the economy, social affairs, finance, sport, culture and news in brief. Through BelgaBox, press journalists and photographers produce hundreds of photos and news reports, dozens of online news items, and audio and video bulletins every day, in two of the three national languages (French and Dutch).
