= Agerpres =

National news agency of Romania

Agerpres National Press Agency
- Native name: Agenția Națională de Presă Agerpres
- Company type: Public
- Industry: News agency
- Founded: 27 March 1889
- Headquarters: Piața Presei Libere, Bucharest, Romania
- Key people: Alexandru Giboi
- Website: agerpres.ro

Agerpres (stylised in all caps; Romanian pronunciation: [ˈad͡ʒerpres]) is the national news agency of Romania.

== History ==
Agerpres is the oldest Romanian news agency and the first autonomous agency in Romania. It was established in March 1889 at the initiative of Foreign Minister Petre P. Carp, as the Telegraph Agency of Romania or Romanian Agency with serving as a "fast and accurate service of all general or special interest news".

The Telegraph Agency of Romania was suspended from the end of 1916 until the end of World War I. On 16 June 1921, it established the agency Orient-Radio, "caring only for the general interest and that of its subscribers".

In 1926, it takes place a new reorganization of the agency, the Romanian Parliament decided shifting to name RADOR - Information Telegraph Agency. Later, in 1949, the first news agency in Romania becomes AGERPRES.

In 1990, is established ROMPRES and six years later ROMPRES becomes a member of the European Alliance of News Agencies (EANA).

The first website of the National Press Agency it is launched in 1999.

The National News Agency returns to the AGERPRES name in July 2008, following the amendment of Law no. 19/2003 on the organization and functioning of the National Press ROMPRES.

Agerpres has the largest archive of photographs from Romania, as well as an internal and external photo service which provides in real-time, over 1,000 photos.

On 17 September 2013, Agerpres went through a rebranding process that consisted of focusing on the online environment, enriching the multimedia area with an interactive video platform and introducing the concept of a complete journalist.

== See also ==
- List of news agencies
