= Croatian News Agency =

- Type: State-owned company
- Industry: News media
- Founded: 26 July 1990; 36 years ago
- Headquarters: Trg Marka Marulića 16, Zagreb, Croatia
- Key people: Branka Valentić (Director)
- Products: Wire service
- Owner: Government of Croatia
- Website: www.hina.hr

Croatian News Agency (Croatian: Hrvatska izvještajna novinska agencija; HINA) is the government-owned national news agency of Croatia. It was established on 26 July 1990. The agency is based at Marko Marulić Square in the Lower Town neighbourhood in central Zagreb.

The total amount of budget funds allocated to HINA in 2014 was 16.7 million HRK (c. 2.2 million EUR).

About 100 journalists produce news items including texts, photos, videos, graphics and audios. The agency also has 25 other bureaus in Croatia and abroad.

== See also ==
- Media of Croatia
