= Athens-Macedonian News Agency =

Greek news agency

- Company type: Subsidiary
- Industry: News agency
- Founded: December 9, 2008
- Headquarters: Athens, Central Greece & Thessaloniki, Macedonia, Greece
- Owner: Greek state
- Website: www.amna.gr

The Athens-Macedonian News Agency (AMNA) (Greek: Αθηναϊκό-Μακεδονικό Πρακτορείο Ειδήσεων, ΑΜΠΕ) is a Greek news agency. It is a public entity anonymous company. It was founded in 2008 as the Athens News Agency - Macedonian Press Agency S.A. (ANA-MPA SA), under a presidential decree which merged the Athens News Agency (ANA SA) and the Macedonian Press Agency (MPA SA).

The company has a nine-member board of directors, of which the majority (five members) comprises representatives of the Journalists' Union of the Athens Daily Newspapers (ESIEA), the Macedonia-Thrace Union of Journalists (ESIEMTH), the Athens Union of Daily Newspaper Owners, the National and Kapodistrian University of Athens (and on rotation every three years the Aristotle University of Thessaloniki and the Panteion University), as well as a representative of the workforce, who is elected by all the company's staff members.
