= Czech News Agency =

National public service news agency in the Czech Republic

- ČTK headquarters entrance, Prague
- Type: Public service
- Industry: News media
- Founded: 1918 (as Czechoslovak Press Agency); 1993 (as Czech Press Agency)
- Headquarters: Prague, Czech Republic
- Area served: Worldwide
- Key people: Jaroslav Kábele (General Director)
- Products: Wire service Stock footage
- Revenue: 256,825,000 Czech koruna (2018)
- Operating income: 6,654,000 Czech koruna (2018)
- Net income: 4,322,000 Czech koruna (2018)
- Total assets: 466,708,000 Czech koruna (2018)
- Number of employees: 273
- Website: ctk.eu

The Czech News Agency (Czech: Česká tisková kancelář), abbreviated to ČTK, is a national public service news agency in the Czech Republic. It provides its services in Czech and English.

== History ==
ČTK was founded on 28 October 1918, on the same day as Czechoslovakia, as Czechoslovak News Agency. It was formed from several unofficial Czech press agencies, which until then functioned in exile. It published in several languages, including in German together with then-official Czechoslovak.

The agency remained throughout both the Nazi and Communist regimes, however, its reporting was highly censored and it served the regimes' needs.

=== As modern ČTK ===
Following the Velvet Revolution of 1989, the government lost its power to interfere in editorial decisions. In 1993, the government relinquished control of the agency, which has since been managed by its CEO in his sole responsibility.

Following the Velvet divorce, the agency split into the Czech Press Agency, which kept using the ČTK branding, and a newly created News Agency of the Slovak Republic, also known as TASR.

Today, the lower house of Czech Parliament elects a ČTK Council, composed of seven members with limited oversight responsibilities. Members of the board are not allowed to be politically active.

Together with the Czech Television and Czech Radio, it belongs to the modern-day Czech public service media. Unlike the other two organisations, ČTK does not receive funds from broadcasting fees since 1996, and is funded by offering commercial services.

== Services ==
Apart from traditional wire service, ČTK offers access to its photo banks and information databases.

ČTK inherited a large photo archive, covering almost the whole of the 20th century. In 2009, it began digitalising several selected parts of its archive. Starting in 2019, it started a full archive digitalisation in cooperation with the National Library of the Czech Republic.

It operates a free news site called Czech Newspaper, which includes a selection of ČTK's reporting that can be accessed without charge.
