= EFE =

Spanish international news agency

Agencia EFE, S.A.

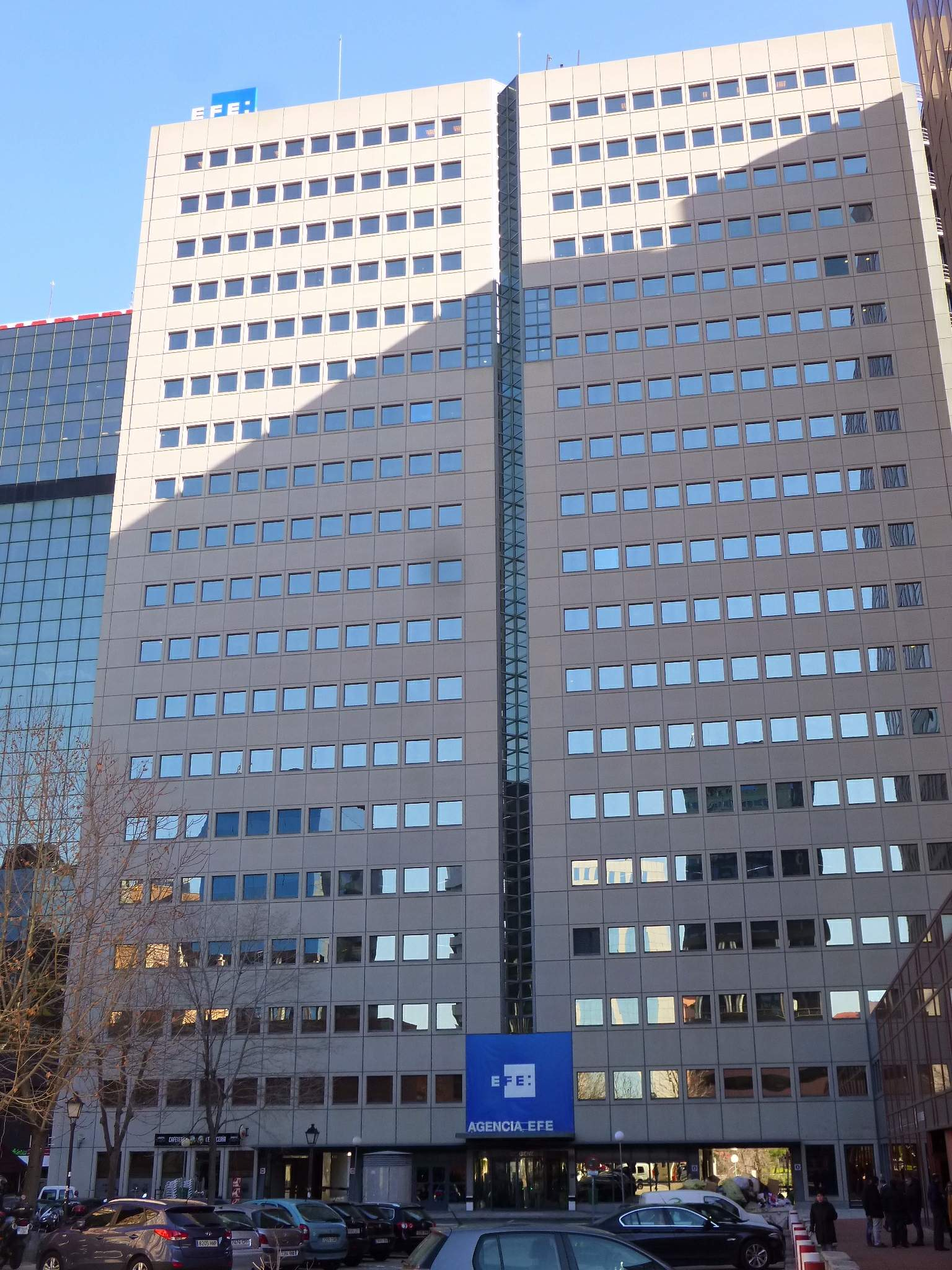
- Type: Sociedad Anónima
- Industry: News media
- Predecessor: Centro de Corresponsales (1865–1919); Fabra (1919–1936)
- Founded: 3 January 1939; 87 years ago
- Founder: Ramón Serrano Súñer
- Headquarters: Avenida de Burgos, 8-B, Madrid, Spain
- Area served: Worldwide
- Products: Wire service
- Number of employees: 1,117 (2025)
- Parent: SEPI
- Website: www.efe.com

Agencia EFE, S.A. (Spanish: [ˈefe]) is a Spanish international news agency, the major Spanish-language multimedia news agency and the world's fourth largest wire service after the Associated Press, Reuters, and Agence France-Presse. EFE was created in 1939 by Ramón Serrano Súñer, then Francoist faction's Interior Minister.

Agencia EFE is a news agency that covers all areas of information in the news media of the press, radio, television and Internet. It distributes around three million news items per year, thanks to its 3,000 journalists from 60 nationalities, operating 24 hours per day from more than 180 cities in 120 countries and with four editorial desks in three continents: Madrid, Bogotá, Cairo (Arabic), and Rio de Janeiro (Portuguese).

== History ==
=== Background ===
The agency dates back to 1865, when the «Correspondents Center» was created – the first news agency in Spain – and promoted by journalist Nilo María Fabra. In 1870 a cooperation agreement was signed with the French agency Havas. With this agreement, the "Corresponsales Center" reserved the distribution rights in Spain of Havas' international news.

In 1919 the Fabra news agency was created, when Havas became part of the shareholding of the "Correspondents Center". Havas withdrew from the shareholding in 1926 at the same time that the Central Bank (a private entity), Santander Bank and Hispanic-American Bank entered into the partnership (these three banks merged at the end of the 20th century into Banco Santander Central Hispano).

=== Foundation and early years ===
EFE was officially founded in the city of Burgos in 1939. The city of Burgos was the headquarters of dictator Francisco Franco. Its founder, Interior Minister Ramón Serrano Suñer, brother-in-law of Franco asked journalist Vicente Gallego (first director of the extinct Ya newspaper) to initiate the project.

On 3 January 1939, the Marquis of Torrehoyos Celedonio de Noriega Ruiz and journalist Luis Amato de Ibarrola – both legal representatives of the Fabra agency – declared before the notary José María Hortelano, that they have agreed to set up a commercial company of an anonymous nature, with the name of Agencia EFE S.A. The Fabra agency contributed with its rights and its name. In this way, the new agency could be admitted to the Club of the Allied Agencies, constituted at that time by some thirty agencies and whose statutes stipulated that only one agency per country could be a member of the association. In addition to the acquisition of Fabra Agency shares by the new agency, technical and human resources from the defunct Faro and Febus agencies were incorporated.

=== Controversy over the origin of the name ===
On the grounds of the denomination "EFE" there is controversy. Contrary to some popular belief, it is not an acronym. The former president and director of the agency Luis María Anson said in an article published in the Ya newspaper that the name of EFE (pronunciation of letter F in Spanish) was due to the participation of the old agencies Fabra, Febus and Faro in the new agency.

However, Ramón Serrano Suñer acknowledged in a letter sent to Antonio Herrero Losada, director of the news agency Europa Press, that the EFE agency was named in this way because "F was the initial letter of Falange y de Fe (English: Falange and of Faith), which was the combat newspaper of the Falange". He also added that "there was no mention that it was also a reason for the name of EFE that this letter was Franco's initial. This would come later."

Herrero Losada, linked to the Fabra agency, denied Ansón recalling that since 1938, in the middle of a civil war, EFE was transmitting news to the media on the Francoist side, where editors of the Fabra agency were being persecuted for their activity. Previously, and another one of those mentioned, Febus, continued his informative service in the republican sector. For his part, José Antonio Giménez Arnáu assured that it was he who provided Serrano Suñer with the idea of creating the agency and drafted its statutes, that EFE had nothing to do with the initial of the Falange or Franco, since according to some sources it occupied the building of the Spanish Falange Editorial (Spanish: Editorial Falange Española), from whose initials it took the name, and that it had a proof that will only be known after its death something that happened three years after the controversy without any revelation.

=== First headquarters and services ===
The first headquarters of Agencia EFE was installed on a floor of a modern building of six heights, inaugurated the previous year, which currently corresponds to number 10 -the 9th in the old numbering- of Victoria Street, Burgos. Its first President was Celedonio Noriega, Marquis of Torrehoyos and its first Managing Director Vicente Gállego Castro.

In 1940, EFE moved its headquarters to a house at number 5 on Ayala Street in Madrid and opened a delegation in Barcelona. The same year Jesús Pabón replaced Noriega as president and four years later, in 1944, the then-Deputy-Director Pedro Gómez Aparicio replaced Vicente Gállego in the direction of the agency.

In 1946, the Comtelsa economic service was created in collaboration, at 50%, with the British agency Reuters. It is known that, at least since this same year, Federico Vélez González, famous and prestigious photographer from Burgos, has been working as a graphic correspondent.

In 1951, EFE installed its first telephotography receiver. In 1958 Gómez Aparicio was replaced in his position by Manuel Aznar Zubigaray, who left office 2 years later. The direction was assumed by the president and the executives of the company for 3 years, until in 1963 the journalist and correspondent abroad, Carlos Sentís, was appointed Managing Director.

=== 1960s to 1980s: Internationalization ===
In 1965 the Buenos Aires delegation opened, the first delegation for the Americas and the next year started the foreign informative service to distribute news through Ibero-America and more delegations were open in other South American countries. In 1967, Miguel Mateu Pla was appointed EFE President. In September of the following year Manuel Aznar took care of the presidency and in 1969 Alexander Armesto was appointed Managing Director.

In 1968, EFE acquired the Fiel news agency and in 1969 started small news services in English and French. In 1972, EFE joined forces with several Central American media to create the Central American News Agency (ACAN), based in Panama. Its expansion through the Americas took Agencia EFE in 1979 to enter like a full member in the Inter American Press Association.

In February 1976, José María Alfaro Polanco was named president of EFE and in September the presidency was assumed by Luis María Anson, who was also Director-General. That same year the first Stylebook of Agencia EFE for the homogeneous writing of the information services of all the world is published, under the direction and advising of the professor and academic Fernando Lázaro Carreter.

In 1977, EFE moved its headquarters to number 32 Espronceda Street, Madrid. That same year, all the information services of the agency went on to use the name EFE, which until then was reserved for international information, so that the division of Cifra, Cifra-Gráfica and Alfil disappeared. That same year, the EFE Journalism Awards were also created, which in 1983 were replaced by the King of Spain Awards.

In 1981, EFE and the Institute for Ibero-American Cooperation created the Department of Urgent Spanish (DEU) with the participation of philologists and prominent academics of the language, with the mission of ensuring the correct use of Spanish in its information services. In 1983, journalist Ricardo Utrilla was appointed president and CEO and an agreement was signed with the US agency UPI to promote the Radio department. The services "Great Signatures" and "End of Century Chronicles" were also created to distribute articles of outstanding intellectuals in Spain and Latin America.

In 1984, EFE formally joined the European Pressphoto Agency (EPA), the first European telephotography agency, with 20% of the company's capital. In 1986, EFE changed its logo and journalist Alfonso Sobrado Palomares was appointed chairman and CEO (Spanish: President-Director-General).

In 1988, the EFE Data service was launched, the first Spanish news data bank, and in March of that same year the EFE Foundation was created to promote research, development and study of information and technology, as well as the granting of training scholarships for students in any of the branches of Information Sciences. In 1989, EFE began distributing its information services to its customers via satellites. This same year the 50th anniversary of the Agencia EFE was celebrated with an itinerant graphic exhibition called Ephemerides. The Press Association of Madrid awarded the Rodríguez Santamaría Award to EFE for its work.

=== 1990s and 21st century ===
Since the 1990s, subsidiaries were created for specific topics. In 1990, the subsidiaries Efeagro (food industry) and Efecom (business) were created, in 1994 Euroefe (EU news - Euractiv) was created and in 2010 Efeverde (environment). In 2013, Efefuturo (science and technology), Efesalud (health), Efe-empresas (business), Efemotor (transport) and Efetur (tourism) were launched. Among them, Efeverde stands out as the most awarded subsidiary for its informative transparency. Efeverde has its own guide for environmental journalists and was one of the first subsidiaries to establish a broad presence in social networks. Since 2011 it has also Android, iPhone and iPad apps.

Achievement awards were also established. In 1990 EFE gave the first Silver Ball Award to the best Ibero-American football player and in 1998 together with UNICEF, they created the Ibero-American Communication Awards for the Rights of Children and Adolescents. In 2004, the Don Quixote Journalism Award was created, which is presented at the same time as the King of Spain Award.

In 1995, EFE was awarded the Prince of Asturias Award for Communication and Humanities in recognition of its work, independence and neutrality. It shared the award with the philosopher José Luis López Aranguren. In 1996, Miguel Ángel Gozalo was named President-Director-General of EFE.

In 1998, the agency's photo library began to function as a digital photographic archive. In 2000, the commercialization and digitization of graphic and press archives began and the Intranet "Entre Nosotros" (Among us) was created. In 2003, the International Graphic Service (SGI) was launched in partnership with EPA and the Multimedia Coordination Unit was inaugurated in Madrid.

In 2001, a service was launched in Portuguese for Brazil. Likewise, that year EFE was transferred from the Directorate-General for State Property of the Ministry of the Treasury to the public holding SEPI. In 2002, an editing center was created in Miami that facilitates the adaptation of the information content to the American market.

In 2004, Álex Grijelmo was named president of EFE, the journalist of the Arturo Larena agency won the National Environment Award in the form of Journalism. That same year the subsidiary ACAN-EFE (the service for Central America) was integrated into EFE.

In 2006, EFE changed its logo and the first Statute of the EFE Editorial Board was approved. In 2007, the Americas Editorial Board moved from Miami to Bogotá, aimed at product integration. In 2008, the EFE-Galicia news service in Galician was launched from Santiago de Compostela.

In March 2012, journalist José Antonio Vera Gil was appointed the new president of EFE to replace Álex Grijelmo.

In 2014, the agency moved to a new headquarters, inaugurated by the Prince and Princess of Asturias, in the Burgos Avenue of the city of Madrid. That year, the 75th anniversary of the agency took place. The Kings inaugurated the great commemorative exhibition of the 75th anniversary of EFE. On the occasion of this commemoration were held more than 30 traveling exhibitions in Spain and the Americas and the Congresses of the European News Agencies (EANA) and Mobile Information and News Data Services (MINDS) in Madrid, as well as the News Agencies of the Mediterranean (AMAN) in Alicante. Seminars were also given in El Escorial and Santander.

In 2015, Fundéu celebrated the 10th anniversary of its foundation. EFE increased its participation in the European Pressphoto Agency up to 49.9%. EFEAgro celebrated 25 years of its existence. It was held an exhibition of EFE in Buenos Aires and Caracas during the 50 years of EFE in the Americas. The 3rd anniversary of EFEsalud was also celebrated in 2015.

In 2016, an exposition was held in Lima for the 50 years of EFE in Peru. The EFE Museum was inaugurated by the Acting Prime Minister, Mariano Rajoy. In July, the news agency and its president were awarded with the Eisenhower Award. In 2017, the EFE-EPA multimedia service in English for Asia began to function. The News 4 Europe line was put into service with EFE, EPA and ten other European news agencies.

In 2018, the State General Budget recognized for the first time the budget of EFE as a Service of General Economic Interest, increasing the public endowment of the agency. In July, journalist Fernando Garea was named the new president of EFE to replace José Antonio Vera Gil.

== Urgent Spanish Department ==
In 1980 the Department of Urgent Spanish was created to combine criteria and norms, as well as to avoid linguistic dispersion and the indiscriminate use of neologisms in Spanish. The department is made up of linguists and philologists together with the Style Advisory Council, composed of members of the Spanish Royal Academy, professors of Philology and journalists. Its main tool is the Urgent Spanish Manual (MEU), the Agencia EFE style manual, which is a very popular Spanish user manual. It began to be published in 1976.

In 2005, the Urgent Spanish Department was replaced by the Urgent Spanish Foundation, commonly known as Fundéu BBVA.

== See also ==
- List of news agencies
