= Deutsche Presse-Agentur =

German news agency

Deutsche Presse-Agentur GmbH
- Type: GmbH
- Industry: News media
- Founded: 18 August 1949; 77 years ago
- Headquarters: Mittelweg 38; 20148 Hamburg, Germany
- Area served: worldwide
- Key people: Peter Kropsch, President & CEO; Sven Gösmann, Editor-in-Chief
- Products: Wire service
- Revenue: ▲€107,363,000 (2025)
- Net income: ▲€1,573,000 (2025)
- Number of employees: ▲692 (2025)
- Website: dpa.com

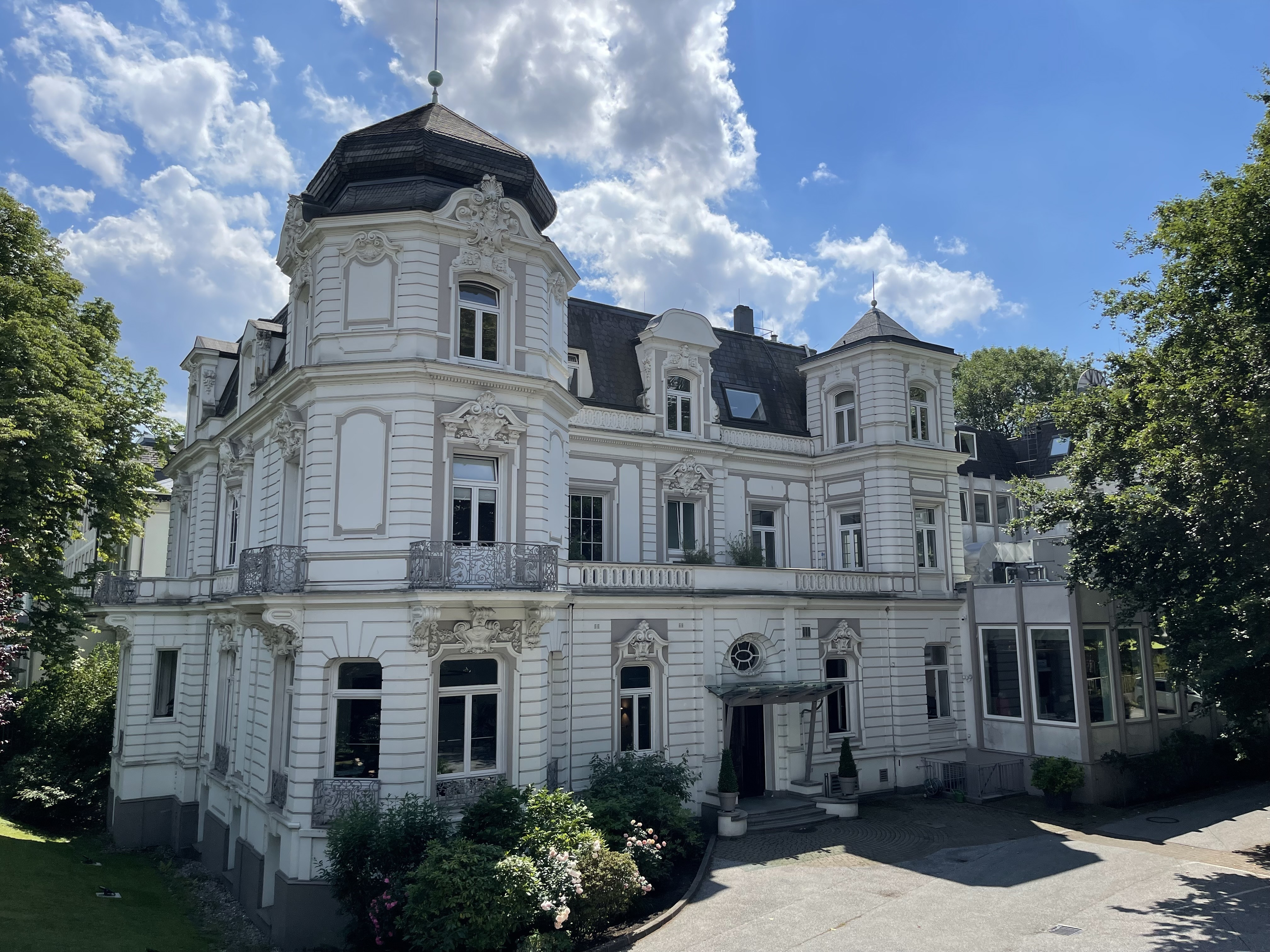
dpa headquarters Hamburg, Germany

Deutsche Presse-Agentur GmbH (abbreviated as dpa; lit. 'German Press Agency') is a German news agency founded in 1949. Based in Hamburg, it has grown to be a major worldwide operation serving print media, radio, television, online, mobile phones, and national news agencies. News is available in seven languages, among them German, English, Spanish and Arabic.

The dpa is the largest press agency in Germany with headquarters in Hamburg and the central editorial office in Berlin. It is represented abroad at 79 locations and maintains 12 state services in Germany with the corresponding offices. In 2025, the agency had 692 employees and a turnover of €107.4 million.

Independence of ideologies, businesses and governments, non-partisanship, and reliability (accuracy always comes before speed) have been announced as the main principles of the agency management and editorial policy.

For decades, almost all German radio stations and newspapers with their own editorial offices have been affiliated to the dpa, meaning they can report on global events without having to maintain their own correspondents and editors. In 2009, several independent regional newspapers, including one of the largest regional publications, the Westdeutsche Allgemeine Zeitung, temporarily dropped the dpa service, but the contract was resumed in December 2012. This large-scale influence of the dpa over public opinion has often been met with criticism.

The agency is member of the European Alliance of News Agencies (EANA). It is certified by the International Fact-Checking Network (IFCN) and European Fact-Checking Standards Network (EFCSN).

== History ==
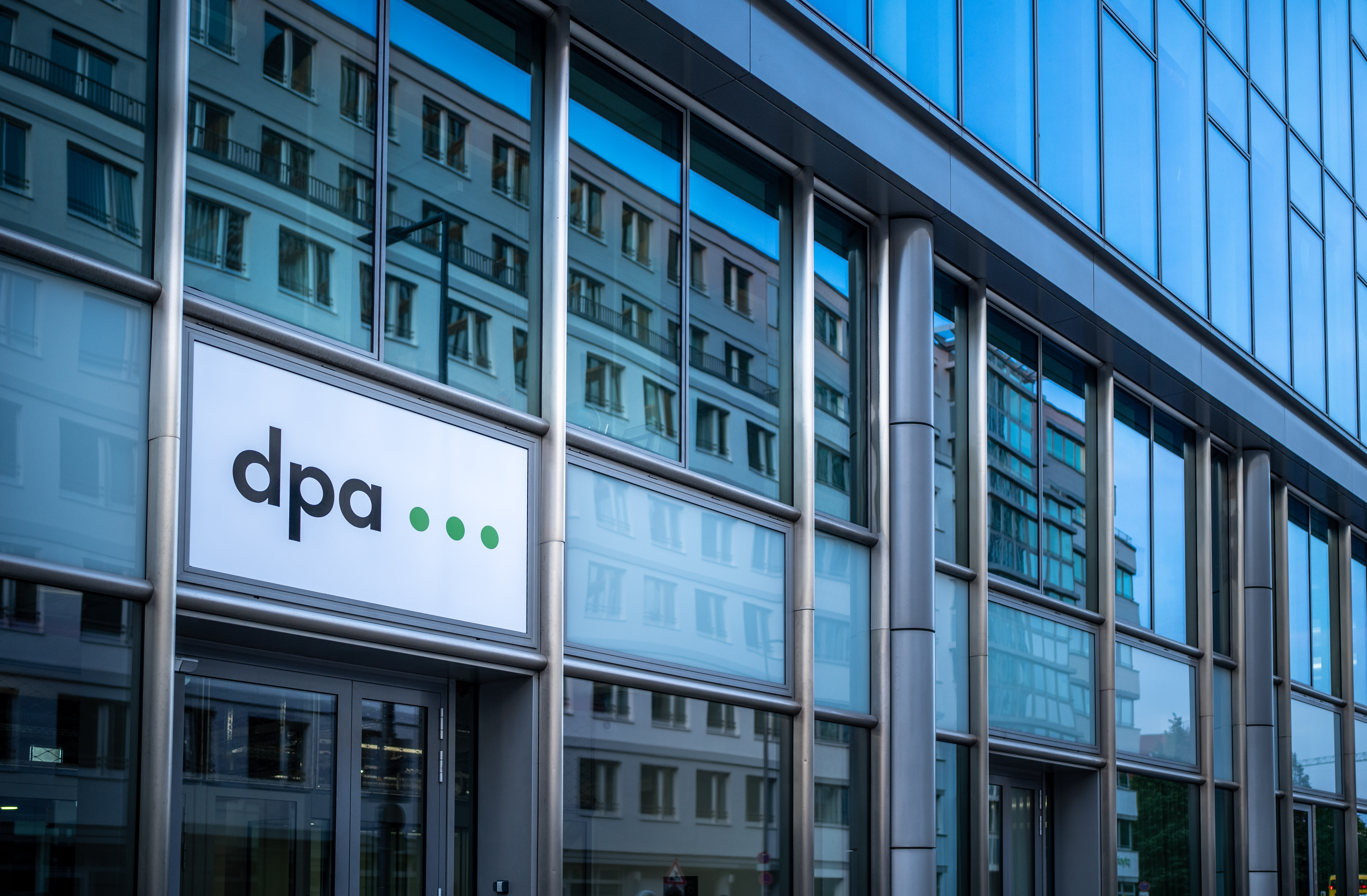
dpa main editorial office Berlin

The dpa was founded as a co-operative between the Deutsche Nachrichtenagentur (en: German News Agency) (Dena), the Deutsche Pressedienst (en: the Germany Press Service), and the Süddeutsche Nachrichtenagentur (Südena) (en: the South German News Agency) in Goslar on 18 August 1949. The co-operative became a limited liability company (de: GmbH) in 1951. Fritz Sänger was the first editor-in-chief. He served as managing director until 1955 and as editor-in-chief until 1959. The first transmission occurred at 6 a.m. on 1 September 1949.

In 1986, the dpa founded Global Media Services (GMS), which bought its competitor Globus Kartendienst GmbH (en: Globus Cartography Service GmbH) in 1988.

In 2010, the editorial headquarters moved to the historical newspaper district of Berlin, the location of the former newsroom for Hamburg, Frankfurt, and Berlin. The corporate headquarters remain in Hamburg, along with subsidiaries news aktuell GmbH, dpa-media technology GmbH, and dpa-infocom GmbH.

== Services ==
=== German language services ===
dpa main wire and dpa regional services publish around 1,100 articles daily from all over the world in the politics, business, sports and panorama sections. An average of 1,000 photos are offered to customers daily via Bildfunk.

dpa customers are offered these services for a flat monthly fee (graded according to the size of the medium).

=== Foreign language services ===
dpa foreign language services are available in English, Spanish and Arabic. The English service is produced in Berlin and Sydney, the Spanish service in Madrid and Berlin, the Arabic service has its main editorial office in Cairo.

In 2008, the dpa announced plans to launch a bilingual news service in Turkish and German in 2009. This service aimed to provide information relevant to the "information needs of citizens of Turkish origin in Germany", as emphasised in a statement. The service was discontinued after a period of nine months.

The dpa cooperates with other news agencies, including Associated Press (AP), Austria Presse-Agentur, DPA-AFX Business News, and Keystone-SDA.

== Spin-offs and co-operations ==
The German Press Agency (dpa) works extensively with a range of agencies in gathering and disseminating news, including foreign companies such as the Austria Press Agency and the Swiss Depeschenagentur. With the Austria Press Agency, the dpa runs the dpa-AFX business news agency.

Since 2013, dpa has been collaborating with the Associated Press news agency from the USA, marketing AP services in German-speaking countries.

The late Head of dpa Picture, Reiner Merkel, established Picture Alliance, a 100% dpa subsidiary, in 2002. The online platform was created as a picture archive platform for use by six leading picture agencies: akg-images, picture agency Huber, dpa picture services, kpa photo archive, Okapia, and Picture Press. Now, over two hundred partner agencies sell their image, video, and illustration material through the dpa-Picture-Alliance.

Other subsidiaries of dpa include dpa infographic GmbH, dpa-IT Services GmbH, Rufa Rundfunk-Agenturdienste, Agencia de Noticias dpa España SL, dpa English Services GmbH, news aktuell GmbH, and dpa-infocom GmbH.

In 2015, dpa also initiated the next media accelerator with a related fund.

== Criticism ==
=== Market Position and Manipulation ===
As the dominant news agency in Germany, the dpa has significant influence over public opinion. Its main competitors within the same market area include the Germany branches of foreign press agencies Agence France-Presse and Thomson Reuters. Domestic competitors include the Evangelical Press Service, the Catholic News Agency and the Sports Information Service.

There have been ongoing accusations of the dpa abusing its power within the marketplace, using its position for agenda-setting and to manipulate the general public. These sentiments have led to isolated recommendations for restrictions to be placed on the agency's power. Such concerns have been reported as early as 1970 with articles published in ZEIT and SPIEGEL generating discussion on the agency's close affiliation to the government and of the dpa colouring its reporting.

=== Structure ===
As early as 1969, the dpa has been subject to critical scrutiny due to its structure. Journalist Stefan Zickler included the company as part of his criticism of the structure of the German Press in a publication in which he challenged the belief that total privatisation of the agency by its around 170 shareholders prevent manipulation of its content. As a company owned by around two hundred shareholders who are responsible for ensuring its independence, the total privatization can be seen as a drawback, as it prevents any state and majoritarian involvement. Furthermore, the ownership also places great power in the hands of the Editor-in-Chief, who can shape the media landscape by controlling how information is disseminated. This potential for conformity among journalists is of great concern.

=== Fact checking ===
After the departure of its founder Fritz Sänger, the German Press Agency came under public criticism several times for spreading unchecked false reports. The most notable examples include a report on the death of Soviet leader Nikita Khrushchev on 13 April 1964 in which the agency fabricated a quote from the then Soviet Premier, Alexei Kosygin, regarding the reunification of Germany in December 1966. In subsequent years, the agency was forced to apologise for inaccurate reports regarding the protests against the G8 summit in Heiligendamm (2007) as well as the news of a scandal involving the then Federal Economics Minister Karl-Theodor zu Guttenberg (2009). The role of the dpa in the Bluewater affair in 2009 led to new internal regulations regarding the sources of the disseminated news.

The Otto Brenner Foundation conducted a large-scale study in March 2010, led by Hans-Jürgen Arlt and Wolfgang Storz. This study, named "Business Journalism during Crisis - The Mass Media's Handling of Financial Market Policy", evaluated the working procedures of the dpa from spring 1999 to autumn 2009. The ultimate conclusion of the study was that German business journalism failed to provide proficient and informative coverage of the financial market and its related policies prior to the onset of the global financial market crisis. The evaluation of the dpa's contribution to financial market policy journalism was described as being "highly deficient" and that it gave a sense of confusion rather than offering orientation. The editor-in-chief of the dpa rejected these criticisms, citing the selectivity of the articles examined as a reason why the results were not representative.

== See also ==
- List of news agencies
