= List of news agencies =

News agencies were created to provide newspapers with information about a wide variety of news events happening around the world. Initially the agencies were meant to provide the news items only to newspapers, but with the passage of time the rapidly developing modern mediums such as radio, television and Internet too adapted the services of news agencies.

Founded in 1835 as Agence Havas, and changing its name in 1944, Agence France-Presse (AFP) is the world's oldest news agency, and is the third largest news agency in the modern world after the Associated Press (AP) and Reuters.

Founded in 1846, Associated Press was founded in New York in the U.S. as a not-for-profit news agency. Associated Press was challenged by the 1907 creation of United Press Associations by E.W. Scripps and the International News Service in 1909 by William Randolph Hearst. United Press absorbed INS to form United Press International in 1958.

In 1851, Reuters was founded in England and is now the second largest news agency in the world with over 2,000 offices across the globe.

With the advent of communism in Russia, Telegraph Agency of the Soviet Union (TASS) was founded in 1925.

Xinhua was later founded as Red China News Services in the Chinese Soviet Republic.

Political change in the Third World resulted in a new wave of information dissemination and a series of news agencies were born out of it. These agencies later formed their own Non-Aligned News Agencies Pool (NANAP), which served as a premiere information service in the Third World.

EFE, a Spanish organization, is the biggest Spanish-language news agency, and the fourth largest worldwide. It was founded in 1939.

The largest German-language news agency is Hamburg's DPA. The oldest German news agency still in operation is the Protestant News Agency EPD, tracing back to 1876.

== List ==
Below is the list of the principal news agencies.

=== A–M ===
- Afghanistan
  - Afghan Islamic Press
  - Bakhtar News Agency
  - Khaama Press
  - Pajhwok Afghan News
- Albania
  - Albanian Telegraphic Agency
- Algeria
  - Algeria Press Service
- Angola
  - Angola Press News Agency
- Argentina
  - Telam
- Armenia
  - Armenpress
  - PanARMENIAN.Net
- Australia
  - Australian Associated Press
  - NCA NewsWire
- Austria
  - Austria Press Agency
- Azerbaijan
  - AZERTAG
  - Trend News Agency
- Bahrain
  - Bahrain News Agency
- Bangladesh
  - Bangladesh Sangbad Sangstha
  - Bdnews24.com
  - United News of Bangladesh
- Belarus
  - BelaPAN
  - BelTA
- Belgium
  - Belga
- Benin
  - Agence Bénin Presse
- Bhutan
  - Bhutan News Service
- Bolivia
  - Agencia Boliviana de Información
  - Agencia de Noticias Fides
- Bosnia and Herzegovina
  - FENA - Federal News Agency - Federalna novinska agencija
- Brazil
  - Agência Brasil
  - Agência Estado
  - Agência O Globo
- Bulgaria
  - Bulgarian News Agency
- Cambodia
  - Agence Kampuchea Press
- Canada
  - The Canadian Press (La Presse Canadienne)
- Cape Verde
  - Inforpress
- China
  - China News Service
  - Xinhua
  - CCTV+
- Croatia
  - Croatian News Agency
  - Informativna katolička agencija
- Cuba
  - Prensa Latina
- Cyprus
  - Cyprus News Agency
- Czech Republic
  - Czech News Agency
- Denmark
  - Ritzau
- East Timor
  - Tatoli
- Ecuador
  - Public News Agency of Ecuador and South America
- Egypt
  - Middle East News Agency
- Estonia
  - Baltic News Service
- Ethiopia
  - Ethiopian News Agency
- Fiji
  - Pacnews
- Finland
  - Suomen Tietotoimisto
- France
  - Agence France-Presse
- Germany
  - Deutsche Presse-Agentur
  - Deutsche Textservice Nachrichtenagentur
  - Sport-Informations-Dienst
  - Evangelischer Pressedienst
- Georgia
  - GHN
- Ghana
  - Ghana News Agency
- Greece
  - Athens-Macedonian News Agency
- Hungary
  - Magyar Távirati Iroda
- India
  - Asian News International
  - Hindusthan Samachar
  - Indo-Asian News Service
  - Press Trust of India
  - United News of India
- Indonesia
  - Antara
  - KBR
- Iran
  - Fars News Agency
  - Iranian Labour News Agency
  - Iranian Students' News Agency
  - Islamic Republic News Agency
  - Mehr News Agency
  - Tasnim News Agency
- Iraq
  - National Iraqi News Agency
  - The New Region
- Israel
  - ITIM
- Italy
  - Adnkronos
  - Agenzia Giornalistica Italia
  - Agenzia Giornalistica RCS
  - Agenzia Nazionale Stampa Associata
  - Ansa Mediterranean
  - APCOM
  - ASCA
  - AsiaNews
  - Il Sole 24 Ore Radiocor
  - Inter Press Service (IPS)
- Japan
  - Jiji Press
  - Kyodo News
- Jordan
  - Ammon News Agency
  - Jordan News Agency
- Kazakhstan
  - Kazinform
- Kenya
  - Kenya News Agency
- Kosovo
  - Kosova Press
- Kuwait
  - Kuwait News Agency
- Kyrgyzstan
  - AKIpress news agency
  - Kabar
- Laos
  - Lao News Agency
- Latvia
  - LETA
- Lithuania
  - ELTA
- Malawi
  - Malawi News Agency
- Malaysia
  - Bernama
- Mexico
  - Notimex
- Moldova
  - Moldpres
- Mongolia
  - Montsame
- Montenegro
  - Montenegrin News Agency
- Morocco
  - Maghreb Arabe Press
- Myanmar
  - Myanmar News Agency
  - Myanmar Now

=== N–Z ===
- Namibia
  - Namibia Press Agency
- Nepal
  - Rastriya Samachar Samiti
- Netherlands
  - Algemeen Nederlands Persbureau (ANP)
- Nigeria
  - News Agency of Nigeria
- North Korea
  - Korean Central News Agency
- North Macedonia
  - Media Information Agency
  - Makfax
- Norway
  - Avisenes Nyhetsbyrå
  - Norsk Telegrambyrå
- Oman
  - Oman News Agency
- Pakistan
  - Associated Press of Pakistan
  - Pakistan Press International
- Palestinian Territories
  - Ma'an News Agency
  - Wafa
- Peru
  - Andina
- Philippines
  - Philippine News Agency
- Poland
  - Polish Press Agency
- Portugal
  - Agência Lusa
  - Via News Agency
- Qatar
  - Qatar News Agency
- Romania
  - AGERPRES
  - Mediafax
  - Rador
- Russia
  - Interfax
  - Rossiya Segodnya
  - Russian News Agency TASS
- Sahrawi Arab Democratic Republic
  - Sahara Press Service
- São Tomé and Príncipe
  - STP-Press
- Saudi Arabia
  - International Islamic News Agency
  - Saudi Press Agency
- Senegal
  - PanaPress
- Serbia
  - Beta News Agency
  - Tanjug (ceased operations, intellectual rights used by private company)
- Seychelles
  - Seychelles News Agency
- Singapore
  - CNA
- Slovakia
  - News Agency of the Slovak Republic
- Slovenia
  - Slovenian Press Agency
- South Africa
  - African News Agency
- South Korea
  - Newsis
  - Yonhap News Agency
- South Sudan
  - South Sudan News Agency
- Spain
  - Agencia EFE
  - Catalan News Agency
  - Europa Press
- Sri Lanka
  - Lankapuvath
- Sudan
  - Sudan News Agency
- Sweden
  - Direkt
  - Tidningarnas Telegrambyrå
- Switzerland
  - Swiss Telegraphic Agency
- Syria
  - Hawar News Agency
  - Syrian Arab News Agency
- Taiwan
  - Central News Agency
- Tajikistan
  - Khovar
- Thailand
  - Thai News Agency
- Tunisia
  - Tunis Afrique Presse
- Turkey
  - Anadolu Agency
  - Anka News Agency
  - Demirören News Agency
  - İhlas News Agency
- Turkmenistan
  - Turkmenistan State News Agency
- Uganda
  - Uganda Radio Network
- Ukraine
  - Ukrainian Independent Information Agency
  - Ukrainian News Agency
  - Ukrinform
- United Arab Emirates
  - Emirates News Agency
  - Gulf Latin
- United Kingdom
  - PA Media
  - Reuters
  - BBC News
  - ITN
  - Sky News
  - South West News Service
  - The Guardian
- United States
  - The Jewish Voice
  - The New York Times
  - Associated Press
  - Bloomberg News
  - Catholic News Agency
  - Catholic News Service
  - Jewish News Syndicate
  - Jewish Telegraphic Agency
  - Religion News Service
  - United Press International
- Uzbekistan
  - Uzbekistan National News Agency
- Vatican City
  - Agenzia Fides
- Venezuela
  - Agencia Venezolana de Noticias
- Vietnam
  - Vietnam News Agency
- Yemen
  - Saba News Agency

== See also ==
- List of press release agencies
