= Study of global communication =

The study of global communication is an interdisciplinary field focusing on global communication, or the ways that people connect, share, relate, and mobilize across geographic, political, economic, social, and cultural divides. Global communication implies a transfer of knowledge and ideas from centers of power to peripheries and the imposition of a new intercultural hegemony by means of the "soft power" of global news and entertainment.

== "International" Or "Global" ==
With the end of the twentieth century and the turn of a new millennium, the global arena and the field of international communication were undergoing significant changes. Some authors started to use the term global communication because it goes beyond the bounds of individual states and emphasizes communication between and among peoples across borders and, importantly, the rise of transnational media corporations.

International communication traditionally refers to communication between and among nation-states and connotes issues of national sovereignty, control of national information resources, and the supremacy of national governments.

Nevertheless, earlier International communication theories have failed to develop models or research agendas that match the reality of the contemporary role of global communication. The old theories only explain part of the global picture and the theories of modernization, dependency, and cultural imperialism have failed to satisfactorily explain global communication.

The term "global", implies a declining role of the state and state sovereignty. As a term, "international" has within it notions of bilateral or multilateral decisions. "Global" could be seen as an aspiration, also as a fear, of the weakening of the state. In addition, global may imply something more pervasive, more geographically inclusive than international.

== History ==
The study of global communication increased dramatically after World War II due to military considerations coupled with their economic and political implications. Earlier attempts at theorizing have failed to develop models or research agendas that match the reality of the contemporary role of global communication.

More global communication research was written in the decade from 1945 to 1955; most of the research of the 1950s dealt with propaganda and the cold war. By 1970, global communication research had grown to include a great variety of subjects, especially comparative mass communication systems, communication and national development and propaganda and public opinion.

From the point of view of global communication scholars, previous theories of modernization, dependency, and cultural imperialism have failed to satisfactorily explain global communication. The old theories only explain part of the global picture.

=== Technological development ===
The emergence of global communication technologies may be considered the origin of the field of global communication in the nineteenth century. Numerous technical advances such as the creation of a new major global communication phenomenon, convergence, digital environments and the internet are some of the major engines driving the change from international communication to global communication.

=== Global power shifts ===
With the collapse of the Soviet Union, the shadow of Cold War has lifted to reveal shifting political, economic, and cultural alliances and conflicts. The increasing importance of these currents, especially in the cultural sphere, demands a reconsideration of the nature of the international communication field within the rubric of international relations.

=== News agencies and propaganda ===
Three key players are usually recognized as the founders of the international news agencies. In 1835, Charles-Louis Havas created the world's first news agency; In 1849, Bernhard Wolff started publishing stock market news and daily reports from Paris, London, Amsterdam, and Frankfurt; In 1849, Paul Julius Freiherr von Reuter established his own commercial service, the Reuter agency, and organized a worldwide exchange of news in 1870.

In 1859, Reuter, Havas and the German Wolff agency reached an agreement to exchange news from all over the world, which was known as the League of Allied Agencies, or the " Ring Combination". In 1848, American News Agency Associated Press was founded and was formally admitted into the "Ring Combination" in 1887.

There are some major factors that point to the growing importance of global communication in the world of the twenty-first century:

1. world population explosion
2. from geopolitics to gaiapolitics
3. increased cross-cultural communication
4. changing concept of community
5. greater centralization of control
6. information explosion
7. changes in technologies
8. greater dependence on global communication
9. greater interdependence and democracy
10. impact of communication on peace and war

== Theoretical approaches and perspectives ==
=== Transcultural political economy ===
Transcultural Political Economy is a concept that is presented in Global Communications by Paula Chakravartty and Yeuzhi Zhao. This concept looks at global communications and media studies in three major areas: global flows of information and culture, decentralizing the conceptual parameters of global information and media studies, and the normative debates in global communications in the context of neoliberalism. Transcultural Political Economy is a multidisciplinary study that focuses on the tensions between political economy and cultural studies. It "integrate[s] institutional and cultural analyzes and address urgent questions in global communications in the context of economic integration, empire formation, and the tensions associated with adapting new privatized technologies, neoliberalized and globalized institutional structures, and hybrid cultural forms and practices". Transcultural Political Economy addresses the issues surrounding the practice of neoliberalism and its creation of unequal power structures within the world system.

=== Globalization theory ===
Globalization theory was popularized in the 1990s as a model for understanding global communication. The concept of globalization inspired a number of theories from various schools of thought in communication studies that each emphasize different aspects of globalization. Many globalization theories highlight actors in the business sector as leaders in the processes of global integration. Transnationalizing business is often celebrated as progression toward a more interconnected world. Globalization theories are often associated with theories of modernity. Some scholars view globalization as the social, political, economic, and cultural integration of societies into a capitalist system; Others see globalization as a successor to modernity, while some see it as an iteration of imperialism. Some question the usefulness and legitimacy of globalization theory, arguing that it does not adequately conceptualize current international relations or function as a lens through which to examine everyday events. Many scholars criticize globalization theories as overzealous toward and unrealistic about the extent of global integration. Some scholars criticize social theorists for offering opinions and predictions based on theory with little practical evidence. In contrast, some scholars work to dispute the pessimistic views of globalization theory.

=== World systems theory ===
World-system theory is a macro-sociological perspective that seeks to explain the dynamics of the "capitalist world economy" as a "total social system". A world-system is what Wallerstein terms a "world-economy", integrated through the market rather than a political centre, in which two or more regions are interdependent with respect to necessities like food, fuel, and two or more polities compete for domination without the emergence of one single centre forever. World-system theory was first articulated by Immanuel Wallerstein. There are three major sources of the world-system theory which conceived by Wallerstein: the Annales school's general methodology, Marx's focus on accumulation process and competitive class struggles and so on, and dependence theory's neo-Marxist explanation of development processes.

Referring to the transnational division of labor, world-system divides the world into core countries, peripheral countries, semi-peripheral countries and external areas. The core countries usually developed a strong central governments, extensive bureaucracies and large mercenary armies, which permit the local bourgeoisie to obtain control over international commerce and extract capital surpluses from the trade for benefits. The peripheral countries often lack strong central governments or been controlled by core countries, they export raw materials and rely on coercive labor practices. Semi-peripheries which served as buffers between the core and the peripheries. They retain limited but declining access to international banking and the production of high-cost high-quality manufactured goods.[3] External areas such as Russia maintain their own economic systems, they want to remain outside the modern world economy.

=== Modernisation theory ===
The theory of modernisation was developed by Daniel Lerner (1958) in The Passing of Traditional Society. According to Lerner, a “modernised” individual possesses the ability to empathise—that is, to imagine oneself in another person’s situation. This idea is rooted in the broader shift from traditional to modern societies. Modern societies are characterised by industrialisation, urbanisation, literacy, and participatory civic engagement. Modernisation theory views development as a linear process, asserting that nations must transform into modern societies in order to become sustainable and prosperous. Such development involves technological advancement and the growth of media systems, which play a key role in fostering a participatory culture.

=== Post-colonialism ===
Post-colonialism is a theoretical approach to looking at literature that examines the colonizer-colonized experience. It deals with the adaptation of formerly colonized nations and their development in cultural, political, economical aspects. Some Notable theoreticians include: Frantz Fanon, Edward Said, Gayatri Spivak, R Siva Kumar, Dipesh Chakrabarty, Derek Gregory.

=== Cultural imperialism ===
Cultural imperialism refers to the process by which a dominant civilisation exerts its cultural influence over another. Less economically prominent cultures often import elements of culture from Western countries, which possess the economic means to produce much of the world’s cultural media, primarily through global media transmission In this process, the less dominant civilisation adopts the customs, philosophies, worldviews and general ways of life of the dominant one. The theoretical foundations of the academic study of cultural imperialism are largely derived from Michel Foucault’s concepts of biopower and governmentality, as well as Edward Saïd’s notion of post-colonialism, with these theories interpreting cultural imperialism as a legacy of colonialism or as a form of Western hegemony. The core argument of cultural imperialism is based on media effects studies integrated with the traditional political economy approach. These studies suggest that there are two opposing effects: the negative effect, in which Western media imposes socio-political conflicts on developing countries and prompts resistance in order to preserve traditional cultural identities, and the positive effect, which involves exposure to Western media contributing to progressive issues such as women’s rights and racial equality. In contemporary usage, the term cultural imperialism most often refers to the global expansion of American culture, which includes brand name products, video media, fast food, and so on.

=== Communication for development (C4D) ===
Communication for Development (C4D) is a praxis oriented aspect of global communication studies that approaches global development with a focus on action and participation for social change enacted through communication systems. C4D underlines "voice, citizenship and collective action" as central values that promote citizen-led development where the visiting party provides guidance rather than direction within the host community. C4D often incorporates bottom-up theories of social change with the aim to create sustainable change which is believed to be more likely to occur if the efforts are planned, implemented, and sustained by community members themselves. Some development workers and academics suggest that a shared definition of communication for development should be clarified, because disagreement within the field can detract from the characteristics that most scholars view as central to current development, including participatory action research (PAR). Many C4D projects revolve around media systems as a central site for social change, which differentiates C4D from other approaches to development. Theories behind C4D highlight that development projects should be contextually situated and that communication technology will affect different types of social change accordingly.

=== Global media studies ===
Global media studies is a field of media study in a global scope. Media study deals with the content, history and effects of media. Media study often draws on theories and methods from the disciplines of cultural studies, rhetoric, philosophy, communication studies, feminist theory, political economy and sociology. Among these study approaches, political economic analysis is non-ignorable in understanding the current media and communication developments. But the political economic research has become more resilient because of stronger empirical studies, and the potential connections to policy-making and alternative praxis.

Each country has its own distinct media ecosystem. The media of mainland China is state-run, so the political subjects are under the strict regulations set by the government while other areas such as sports, finance, and increasingly lucrative entertainment industry face less regulation from government. Canada has a well-developed media sector, but the mass media is threatened by the direct outcome of American economic and cultural imperialism which hinder the form of Canada's media identity. Many of the media in America are controlled by large for-profit corporations who reap revenues from advertisings, subscriptions and the sale of copyrighted materials. Currently, six corporations (Comcast, The Walt Disney Company, News Corporation, Time Warner, Viacom and CBS Corporation) have controlled roughly 90% of the America media. Such figures come from the policies of the federal government or the tendency to natural monopolies in the industry.

== Central debates ==
=== Global power shifts ===
Immanuel Wallerstein's world system theory develops a basic framework to understand global power shifts in the rise of the modern world. Wallerstein proposes four different categories: core, semi-periphery, periphery, and external, in terms of different region's relative position in the world system. The core regions are the ones that benefited the most from the capitalist world economy, such as England and France. The peripheral areas relied on and exported raw materials to the core, such as Eastern Europe and Latin America. The semi-peripheries are either core regions in decline or peripheries attempting to improve their relative position in the world system, such as Portugal and Spain. The external areas managed to remain outside the modern world economy, such as Russia.

There are two basic types of global power shifts in the 21st century. One is traditional power transition amongst states, which follows Wallerstein's world system theory. For instance, the global power shifts from the West to the East since the rise of Asia. The other is power diffusion, the way that power move from states to non-states actors. For instance, "climate change, drug trade, financial flows, pandemics, all these things that cross borders outsider the control of governments."

=== Global public sphere ===
Public sphere theory, attributed to Jurgen Habermas, is a theory that in its basic premise conceives of democratic governments as those that can stand criticism that comes from public spheres. Public spheres are places, physical or imagined, where people discuss any kind of topic, particularly topics of a societal or political nature. Global public sphere is, therefore, a public that is made of people from across the globe, who come together to discuss and act on issues that concern them. The concept of global public sphere is linked to the shift of public sphere, from restricted to nation-state, to made of individuals and groups connected across as well as within borders.

Since Plato, it can be argued that philosophers have been thinking about versions of a common space for all people to debate in; however, a global public sphere that can fit the description above began to appear much later. In the second half of the 20th century, the legacy of World War II and technological advancements created a new sense of the global and started the economic and political phenomena that we now call globalization. This includes the expansion of humankind into space, which gave individuals the sense of a global unity, the growth of satellite technology, which allowed for people across the globe to view the same television channels, and the internet, which can provide access to an unprecedented amount of information and spaces to connect with other people.

=== Cultural industries ===
The term "culture industry" appeared in the post-war period. At that time, culture and industry were argued to be opposites. "Cultural industries" are also referred to as the "Creative industries".

==== Definitions and scope of cultural industries ====
In the present day, there remain different interpretations of culture as an industry. For some, cultural industries are simply those industries that produce cultural goods and services.

In the United Nations Educational, Scientific and Cultural Organization (UNESCO), the cultural industries are regarded as those industries that "combine the creation, production and commercialization of contents which are intangible and cultural in nature. These contents are typically protected by copyright and they can take the form of goods or services". According to UNESCO, an essential part of cultural industries is that they are "central in promoting and maintaining cultural diversity and in ensuring democratic access to culture". "Cultural industries" combines the cultural and economic, which gives the cultural industries a distinctive profile.

In France, the "cultural industries" have recently been defined as a set of economic activities that combine the functions of conception, creation and production of culture with more industrial functions in the large-scale manufacture and commercialization cultural products.

In Canada, economic activities involved in the preservation of heritage are also included in the definition of culture.

==== Global cultural industries ====
Since the rise of the cultural industries has occurred simultaneously with economic globalization, cultural industries have close connections with globalization and global communication.

Herbert Schiller argued that the 'entertainment, communications and information (ECI) complex were having a direct impact on culture and human consciousness. As Schiller argued, the result of transnational corporate expansion is the perpetuation of cultural imperialism, defined as "the sum of the processes by which a society is brought into the modern world system and how its dominating stratum is attracted, pressured, forced, and sometimes bribed into shaping social institutions to correspond to, or even promote, the values and structures of the dominating centre of the system".

The second wave of transnational corporate expansion, which began in the 1970s with the emergence of Export Processing Zones in developing countries, is focused on the development of global production networks. This process was described as a "new international division of labour" (NIDL) by the German political economists Frӧbel et al. (1980).

Ernst and Kim have argued that GPNs are changing the nature of the multinational corporation itself, from "stand alone overseas investment projects, to "global network flagships" that integrate their dispersed supply, knowledge and customer bases into global and regional production networks", entailing a shift from top-down hierarchical models of corporate control to increasingly networked and collective forms of organization.

==== Global media empires ====
The largest firms in media and media-related industries have a very high international profile. Global media empires such as Disney, News Corporation, Time-Warner and Viacom-CBS now derive 25-45 per cent of their revenues outside of the United States.

It is often argued that the global media are dominated by a small number of powerful media conglomerates. Edward S. Herman and Robert W. McChesney (1997) argued that the global media were "dominated by three or four dozen large transnational corporations (TNCs) with fewer than ten mostly US-based media conglomerates towering over the global market." Similarly, Manfred Steger has observed that " to a very large extent, the global cultural flows of our time are generated and directed by global media empires that rely on powerful communication technologies to spread their message." He also argued that during the last two decades, a few very large TNCs would come to dominate the global market for entertainment, news, television, and film.

=== Diaspora ===
Diaspora is often confused with exodus. Diasporas are minority groups that have a sense of connection with a larger community outside of the borders they currently inhabit, and through diasporic media create a sense of a larger identity and community, whether imagined or real. In scholarly work about diaspora in communication studies, the view of nation and culture as interchangeable terms is no longer prevalent. Stuart Hall theorized of hybridity, which he distinguished from "old style pluralism", "nomadic voyaging of the postmodern", and "global homogenization". Hybridity is the retention of an original identity and strong ties to an original country and tradition, but with the understanding that there is no unchanged, ideal nation of the past that they can return to. To be hybrid is to also adapt to a new culture and tradition without simply assimilating in it, but rather negotiating a place between the "original" and "new" cultures. In Communication studies, diaspora is discussed as the identity that unifies people across time and space, sometimes existing in physical spaces and other times existing in imagined 'non-spaces'. However, it has been argued that the concept of 'diaspora' implies ethnic homogeneity and essentializes identity to only ethnicity. One of the most cited and well-known works in the field of diasporic media is Hamid Naficy's work on exiled Iranian Americans' creation of cable television in the United States.

Diasporic media refer to media that address the needs of particular ethnic, religious, and/or linguistic groups that live in multicultural settings . Diasporic media can be in the diaspora's traditional language or in another language, and they can include news or media from the "origin" country or they can contain the diaspora's local news or media. Diasporic media can be created in radio, television, film, music, in newspapers, magazines, and other publishing, as well as online. It can be argued that the development and spread of satellite television is an instrumental element of the growth of diasporic media today. Satellite television allowed migrants to access the news and popular culture from their homeland, as well as allowing people who speak the same language to access the same channels that might be produced outside of the "homeland"

Contemporary studies of diaspora show that diasporic media are part of the change in the tendency Immanuel Wallerstein described in his world systems theory. The world systems theory postulates that much of the flow of people in the world has been from the 'periphery', or economically-developing states, towards the centre; which are often metropolitan, economically-wealthy states that grew their wealth in colonialist entrepreneurship. However, contrary to the movement of people, the flow of information (including media products), has tended to be from the centre to the periphery.

=== Technology and media ===
The advancement of media and technology have played the pivotal role in process of globalization and global communication. Cable television, ISDN, digitalization, direct broadcast satellites as well as the Internet have created a situation where vast amounts of information can be transferred around the globe in a matter of seconds.

During the early 20th century, telegraph, telephony, and radio started the process of global communication. As media technologies developed intensely, they were thought to create, in Marshall McLuhan’ s famous words, a ‘‘global village.’’ The launch of Sputnik, the world’ s first artificial satellite, on October 4, 1957, marked the beginning of technologies that would further interconnect the world. The first live global television broadcast occurred when Neil Armstrong stepped onto the moon in July 1969. In November 1972, pay TV caused expansion of cable when Service Electric offered Home Box Office over its cable system. By 2000, over direct broadcast satellite, a household could receive channels from all over the world. Now with the World Wide Web, smart phones, tablet devices, smart televisions and other digital media devices, billions of people are now able to access media content that was once tied to particular communications media (print, broadcast) or platforms (newspapers, magazines, radio, television, cinema).

=== Justice ===
Justice in communication studies includes, but is not limited to, the concern with democratic process and fostering democratic publics . Jurgen Habermas theorized of public sphere (in The Structural Transformation of the Public Sphere) as the space that is created whenever matters of common concern are discussed between the state and civil society. Thus, public sphere includes not only the media, but also public protest in the form of marches, demonstrations, et cetera. There are, however, critiques of political economy in whose view it is impossible to work within the current system to produce democratic publics. Such a critique is that produced by Karl Marx, who saw institutions such as parliament, the state, the 'acceptable' public sphere, economic enterprises, and so on as structurally produced and perpetuated by a capitalist system, and thus they can not be mobilized to change it. In such a system, there can only be illusory justice, which is fair only within the logic of the system. This illusion of justice is produced through dominating ideology.

Another issue of justice in communication studies is the question of decolonizing research methods and theoretical discourse . The idea of decolonizing research comes from a rejection of the functionalist approach, which assumed that research can be conducted in a vacuum, free of ideology or the researcher's biases. This approach assumed cultures to be unchanging, homogenous, and isolated from each other. The purpose of decolonizing research and discourse is to 'uncloak' research as an unbiased power structure, and produce research that is more self-aware. The approach in decolonizing research methods attempts to create methodologies that treat the people in the study as participants or partners, rather than subjects - which is a term that in itself carries strong connotations of colonialism. Decolonizing research also involves moving away from Eurocentric models that are assumed to work anywhere else, and instead to create work that is more useful in local contexts. Decolonial approaches specifically seek to produce knowledge about the mechanisms and effects of colonialism. These approaches allow former subjects to 'talk back', which is a reflection of independent agency, on the colonizer's own terms of research, rather than to be 'given' a voice, which is an unequal power structure.
