= Samachar (disambiguation) =

Samachar (lit. 'news' in Indic languages) may refer to:

- Samachar, a news agency formed during the emergency after merging Press Trust of India, United News of India, Samachar Bharati and Hindustan Samachar
- Samachar (website), news website from Mahindra Satyam
- Samachar Chandrika, a 19th-century Bengali-language newspaper in India
- Samachar Darpan, a Bengali-language weekly newspaper, one of the first in India
