= United Press of India =

Indian newspaper

- Industry: News media
- Founded: 1933
- Founder: Bidhu Bhusan Sengupta
- Defunct: 1958
- Headquarters: India
- Key people: Bidhu Bhusan Sengupta (managing director); Bidhan Chandra Roy (chairman of board of directors)

United Press of India was an Indian newspaper during British Raj. It was established in 1933 by Bidhu Bhusan Sengupta, who was also the first managing director of the agency.

== History ==
After resigning from Free Press of India, Sengupta started United Press of India with Bidhan Chandra Roy as the chairman of the Board of Directors of the agency. Due to financial constraints, the agency collapsed in 1958.

== See also ==
- United News of India
- Samachar
- Press Trust of India
- Hindusthan Samachar

== Bibliography ==
- Shrivastava, K. M. (2007). News Agencies from Pigeon to Internet. Sterling Publishers Pvt. Ltd. ISBN 9781932705676.
