= Botho von Hülsen =

German theater manager (1815-1886)

Botho von Hülsen (10 December 1815 – 30 September 1886) was a manager of the Royal Prussian Court theater, and president of the Deutscher Bühnenverein.

== Life ==
Born in Berlin, Hülsen received his education from 1825 in the Cadet Corps in Potsdam. From there he was transferred to the 1st (Emperor Alexander) Guards Grenadiers of the Prussian Army on 5 August 1833 as a fähnrich holder and advanced to second lieutenant in February 1834. Between 1841 and 1843 he was stationed in Königsberg and there got to know the actress Sophie Schröder-Devrient, among others, via the theater. From 1844 he was entrusted with the performance of smaller plays for troop support in Berlin.

In March 1848, Hülsen took part in the barricade fights in Berlin and became an Oberleutnant and regimental adjutant at the beginning of April. In this position he was deployed during the First Schleswig War and in 1849 during the suppression of the May Uprising in Dresden. In this politically difficult time (German revolutions of 1848-49), King Frederick William IV of Prussia appointed him Generalintendant of the court music. On 12 April 1851 Hülsen retired with the title of Hauptmann (Captain) and was granted permission to wear his regimental uniform.

Following his farewell in May 1851 he was appointed Kammerherr, and at the request of King Friedrich Wilhelm IV's request, he succeeded Karl Theodor von Küstner as Generalintendanten der Königlichen Schauspiele zu Berlin (Konzerthaus Berlin, Staatsoper Unter den Linden) and took up this office on 1 June. In 1866 Hülsen was appointed a major and aide-de-camp for the duration of the Austro-Prussian War to the Berlin governorate. In the same year, by royal decree, the court theatres in Kassel, Hannover and Wiesbaden were also ordered under his direction.

In 1883, Hülsen founded the "Hülsen Foundation" to support members of the ensemble in need or dire straits. During this time he also served as president of the Deutscher Bühnenverein. As such he enforced the theatre holidays common today and was decisively involved in the abolition of interlude music.

At age 70, Hülsen died on 30 September 1886 in Berlin and is buried there. The general Leo Geyr von Schweppenburg was his grandson.

== Sources ==
- Karl Frenzel: Berliner Dramaturgie. 2 volumes. Rümpler, Hannover 1877.
- Friedrich Haase: Was ich erlebte. Bong, Berlin 1899.
- Helene von Hülsen: Unter zwei Königen. Erinnerungen an Botho von Hülsen, General-Intendant der königlichen Schauspiele; 1851-1886. Eckstein, Berlin 1889.
- Charlotte Klinger: Das königliche Schauspielhaus in Berlin unter Botho von Hülsen. 1869-1886. Thesis. Freie Universität Berlin 1954.
- Claus von Lettow-Vorbeck: Gedenkblätter zur Rang-Liste des Kaiser Alexander Garde-Grenadier-Regiments No. 1. W. Moeser, Berlin 1899, p. 73–74.
- Max Martersteig: Das deutsche Theater im 19. Jahrhundert. Eine kulturgeschichtliche Darstellung. 2nd edition. Breitkopf & Härtel, Leipzig 1924.
- Paul Schlenther: Botho von Hülsen und seine Leute. Eine Jubiläumskritik über das Berliner Hofschauspiel. Gerstmann, Berlin 1883.
- Gothaisches genealogisches Taschenbuch der adeligen Häuser. 1901, First volume, p. 438
