= Global Video Media Forum =

The Global Video Media Forum (VMF) is a forum founded by CCTV+ in 2011. It is held once a year and invited professionals from the global media industry to participate to discuss world hot topics, media development trends and the latest technology applications. The purpose is to inspire innovation and achieve communication and cooperation. It is a platform for professional exchanges between media professionals from all over the world.

Each year, the forum selects different themes, and arranges multiple keynote speeches, special discussions, and case sharing during the two-day event. Due to the epidemic, the 11th Forum in 2021 held online for the first time.

Themes of previous forums
year	theme
2011	World Through Asian Eyes
2012	-
2013	-
2014	News Media Meets NewMedia
2015	Link the World with Chinese Media
2016	Video is Changing the World
2017	A Shared Future
2018	Opening and Connecting the World
2019	Media VS Technology
2020	Media Collaboration win-win future
