= Mass media in Serbia =

The mass media in Serbia refers to mass media outlets based in Serbia. Both state-owned and for-profit corporations operate television, magazines, and newspapers, which depend on advertising, subscription, and other sales-related revenues.

While freedom of speech and freedom of the press are guaranteed by the Constitution of Serbia and the legal system of Serbia, and the media system has seen limited transformation following a decade-long struggle against media repression under the Milošević regime that ended in 2000, multiple factors impede the full functioning of a free and fair press in Serbia. As of 2024, Serbia ranks 98th out of 180 countries in the Press Freedom Index report compiled by Reporters Without Borders, with press freedom described as 'problematic', with the 2024 ranking representing a backsliding in progress, with Serbia dropping down from 59th in 2016.

== History ==
The 1990s saw the end of state monopoly over the media. Throughout the decade, the media remained divided between state-controlled and independent ones. Media autonomy and the survival of independent media remained a major bone of contention during the rule of Slobodan Milošević. During this time, the media was a tool against domestic and international enemies. Civil society and international donors stood behind the creation of independent media. According to the Association for Private Broadcasting Development, Serbia hosted 480 radio and TV stations in 2000, 300 of which were privately owned, and the rest were local, public media.

The control over the media was reached through different strategies. On the one hand, the legal framework on the media system was purposefully left chaotic, while the state maintained the monopoly over the distribution of frequencies and production of newsprints, printing facilities, and distribution networks. Moreover, non-aligned journalists, media outlets, and media advertisers were harassed, jammed, or forcefully closed down – particularly if perceived as dangerous to the government, such as elections, the 1996–97 mass demonstrations, and the 1998–99 war in Kosovo.

After the overthrow of Slobodan Milošević, most state media changed overnight and supported the new ruling coalition, DOS. The political changes made way for the reconstruction of the media sector. However, post-Milošević governments were unable to bring the transition to completion. A media policy was neglected for the whole decade between 2001 and 2010, not to risk electoral support by unsettling the status quo.

The media sector was thus reformed slowly and incoherently, after a long delay. In 2010, Serbia had 523 print media, 201 radio stations, 103 TV stations, and 66 online media. Almost 2.2 million Serbs regularly read print media daily and listen to the radio for on average almost three hours a day. Yet, media sustainability remains at risk due to small advertisement revenues. New challenges include increasing concentration of the advertisement sector, opening up to the risk of pressures from economic groups linked to political parties, as well as the dire general economic conditions in the wake of the global economic crisis. The Southeast European Media Observatory estimated that 25-40% of media advertising revenue in 2014 came from the state; such public spending is not regulated.

== Legislative framework ==
The Constitution of Serbia establishes media without prior authorization (art. 50). Licenses, required for TV and radio stations, are granted by an independent body, the Republic Broadcasting Agency (RBA). Censorship is prohibited by the Constitution.

The legislative framework on the media in Serbia includes a Law on Public Information, a Law on Broadcasting, a Law on Free Access to Information of Public Importance, and a Law on Elections of the Members of the Parliament (regulating electoral coverage). The Public Information Law explicitly protects journalistic secrecy, and the Criminal Code excludes journalists from the obligation to disclose their sources to the courts, unless for grave crimes (punishable by more than five-year sentences, art.41) Despite the 2004 Law on Free Access to Information of Public Importance, media efforts are often obstructed by authorities.

The Broadcasting Law foresees a specific media concentration regime, restricting the ownership of two or more terrestrial TV or radio stations within the same or overlapping area, as well as the cross-ownership of TVs, radios, daily newspapers, and news agencies. Yet, these norms are almost impossible to implement when ownership of media is often obscure. The lack of transparency of media ownership is reported as one of the main issues of the sector.

In 2012, the real owners of 18 over 30 major news outlets in Serbia remained unknown. In 2009, a Media Register was introduced by amending the Public Information Law, but the amendments were later declared unconstitutional. The 2009 Data Secrecy law shows the liability of journalists if they reveal information related to national security, public safety, and foreign affairs.

Three news media laws were adopted in August 2014, bringing the Serbian legal framework closer to EU standards. They foresee the privatisation of almost all publicly owned media outlets, and the end of direct state subsidies by mid-2015, replaced by a system of grants (public service broadcasters RTS and RTV, as well as minority media, are exempt from privatisation and have been funded by a subscription fee since 2016). The laws also establish a media register for the disclosure of media ownership structures, and the preparation for the digitalisation of television by 2015. Their implementation remains to be checked.

The government is committed to the completion of the privatisation strategy for media outlets. Previously, several privatisations have failed, while others have given rise to doubts about a lack of transparency, state interference, pressures, and deals to keep them under hidden state control. Foreign investors are allowed to own up to 49% of the capital of broadcast license holders, but their actual influence on the editorial line is hard to determine. The advertising market is also occupied by state-owned companies

=== Status and self-regulation of journalists ===
The category of journalist is not a registered or licensed profession in Serbia, with formal criteria and procedures. The Journalists' Association recorded in early 2016 around 6,000 journalists in Serbia.

Journalists in Serbia have a low social status and low social protection. Most journalists have irregular income and no health insurance; their average pay is half of the national average salary, and seven times lower than public officials' salaries. Unfavourable working conditions lead to work overload, low-quality productions, and a lack of attractiveness of the profession for the talented youth.

Journalists' organisations remain unable to provide efficient protection and secure professional dignity; journalists are poorly paid and have a very low public reputation. The context of business and political pressures, coupled with the lack of legal protection and the difficult working conditions make so that the general perception of the category by the broad public is of politicised and corrupt "dictaphone holders".

Cases of threats and attacks on journalists persist. In 2008, there were 138 attacks on journalists whilst performing their jobs. The Serbian police is deemed ineffective in tracking down the responsible of threats to journalists.

The journalists' associations UNS and NUNS each have its code of conduct for journalists. Both agreed to a common Ethical Code of Serbian Journalists (Serbian: Eticki kodeks novinara Srbije) in 2006. ANEM also adopted an Ethical Code for Broadcasters in 2002, placing truthful reporting at the top. However, several violations of the Codes have been reported, particularly by daily political tabloid papers, concerning the presumption of innocence, protection of privacy, and protection of minors. Since 2010, its respect has been monitored by the Press Council, a self-regulatory body for the print media. The council can only publish public statements, as sanctions.

A 2015 survey among journalists reported on the casualisation of work relations in the profession, but also testified to the persistent professional integrity of Serbian journalists. Some 40% of journalists would be ready to leave the profession, while 40% thers would be ready to remain under even lower work conditions.

== Media freedom ==
The freedom of the press and the freedom of speech are guaranteed by the constitution of Serbia Serbian media are heavily dependent on advertising contracts and government subsidies which make journalists and media outlets exposed to economic pressures, such as payment defaults, termination of contracts, and more. As of 2024, Serbia ranks 98th out of 180 countries in the Press Freedom Index report compiled by Reporters without borders, down from 59th in 2016.

== Media outlets ==
=== Print media ===
Serbia got its first newspaper in 1834. Politika was launched in 1904 and continues today as a civic-oriented newspaper; it is the oldest daily newspaper in the Balkans. Politika introduced fact-based reporting, editorials, sport sections, and female journalists to the region, thus contributing to the modernization and Europeanization of journalistic standards in Serbia.

During the socialist period, the press in Yugoslavia served as a propaganda tool of the ruling Communist Party. The media landscape was dominated by the Communist Party daily, Borba. Serbian: Politika evolved into the house organ of the People's Front, a wide union of anti-fascist and socialist forces. The 1960s, with the introduction of workers' self-management, saw the start of the liberation of Yugoslav media from the total dominance by the Communist Party.

In the 1990s, print media were split among supporters and opposers of the regime. The circulation and influence of alternative print media rose throughout the 1990s and were deemed the avant-garde of democratization. Serbian: Politika and Borba switched roles: after decades of distancing from the Socialist leadership, Politika aligned with the government, while Borba became a critically oriented newspaper.

After 2000, tabloid press spread, and commercial and entertainment press advanced. Many news outlets were privatized, some of them also in the hands of foreign investors, including Serbian: Politika and Blic. The lack of transparency over ownership of media groups remains an issue, especially for short-lived political tabloids, which are often used for political campaigns. Tabloids in Serbia are "characterized by conservativism, nationalistic ideology, hate speech, and disregard of professional and ethical norms", Thin resources result in their journalists specializing mostly on political issues rather than broader topics, like economics or the environment, that could attract new readers interested in quality journalism. As of 2019, there were 1,427 magazines published in Serbia.

=== Radio broadcasting ===
Radio Belgrade started operating in 1929 as a state enterprise. The earlier local radio stations appeared after the Second World War, the first one in Zaječar in 1944, and started growing since the 1960s. They were funded by local governments and set up with the expertise of Radio Beograd, as part of the media instruments of local governments, together with local newspapers and later TV stations.

Commercial radio stations were established only in the 1990s. A precursors was Studio B, set up in 1970 by the journalists of Borba, based on the model of western radio stations, with music and short local news programmes focusing on issues of daily lives and how to solve them. Its style found a country-wide success.

Radio B92 started as an experimental youth initiative in Belgrade in 1989. It conquered its audience with irony and mockery, developing from an underground project to the most prominent alternative media, promoting a liberal and humanistic spirit, an anti-war, and anti-nationalist orientation. The government closed it down four times, but every time it gathered even stronger support. B92 also spurred the growth of a network of independent radios (ANEM), re-broadcasting B92 news programmes together with locally produced contents. The role of B92 in fostering free media won it the MTV Free Your Mind award in 1998, together with many other awards.

There are currently 220 radio stations in Serbia. Out of these, seven are radio stations with national coverage, including three of public broadcaster Radio Television of Serbia (Radio Belgrade 1, Radio Belgrade 2/Radio Belgrade 3 and Radio Belgrade 202), and four private ones (Radio S1, Radio S2, Play Radio, and Radio Hit FM). Also, there are 49 regional stations and 162 local stations.

=== Television broadcasting ===
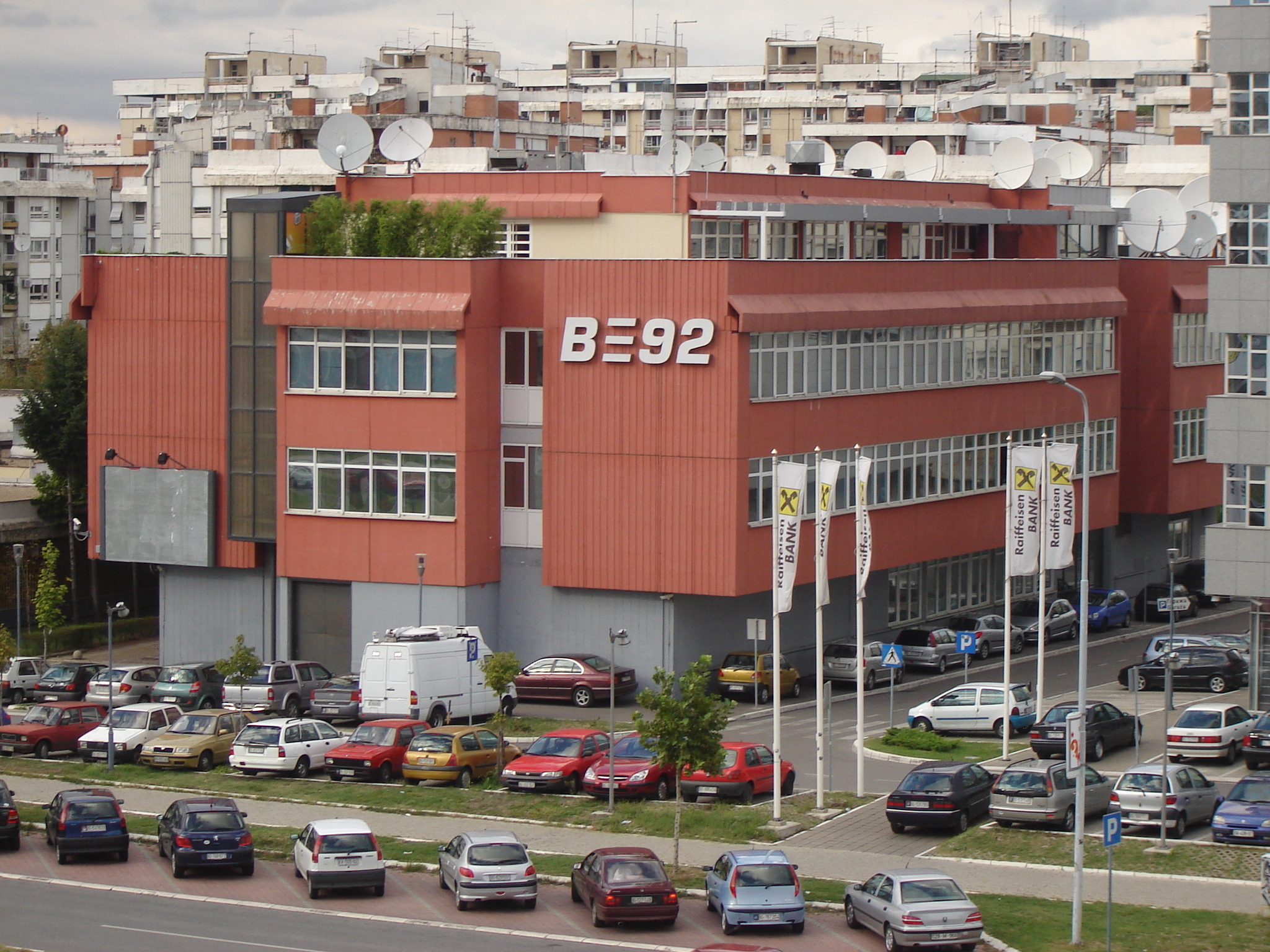
Old B92 headquarters in Novi Beograd

Television broadcasting started in 1958 with each Yugoslav republic having its station. In Serbia, the state television station was known as Television Belgrade (RTB) and became known as Radio Television of Serbia after the breakup of Yugoslavia. A second channel was launched in 1972, and a third in 1989. Under the Communists and Slobodan Milošević, state broadcasting was controlled by the ruling party, leading to RTS headquarters being targeted and bombed during the NATO action against Yugoslavia.

The system developed from a public monopoly, with regional centres like TV Novi Sad and TV Pristina, into a dual, public and private system. While suppressing the development of alternative statewide channels, the government of Serbia allowed the broadcasts of regional and local commercial stations (which could profit from unlimited advertisement time to sell), as well as new pro-government local TV outlets.

Television remains the most widespread and popular medium in Serbia. According to AGB Nielsen Research in 2009, Serbs watch five hours of television per day on average, the highest average in Europe. Television is the main source of news and information for citizens (85%, against 11% for the press and 2% for radio and internet each), while the biggest share of audience goes to entertainment programmes.

The television market in Serbia is saturated. In 2001, there were 253 TV stations; that was later halved to 109 licenses. There are seven nationwide free-to-air television channels, with public broadcaster Radio Television of Serbia operating three (RTS 1 (Serbian TV channel), RTS 2 and RTS3) and four private broadcasters: Prva, O2.TV, Pink and Happy TV. Viewing shares for these channels in 2016 were: 19.2% for RTS1, 14.8% for Pink, 9.7% for Prva, 7.9% for Happy TV, 5.8% for B92, and 3.1% for RTS2. There are 28 regional channels and 74 local channels. Besides terrestrial channels there are a dozen Serbian television channels available only on cable or satellite.

Serbia completed the transition to digital broadcasting in 2015, having chosen MPEG-4 compression standard and DVB-T2 standard for signal transmission.

=== News agencies ===
==== Active ====
There are three national news agencies in Serbia: Beta, Fonet and Tanjug Tačno. "Tačno" d.o.o. uses intellectual rights of former state news agency Tanjug.

- Beta was launched in 1994 by 12 journalists, and has 44 employees (as of 2023), providing services in Serbian, English, and minority languages (Hungarian, Albanian, Romani) on the event in the wider Southeast Europe region. Beta founded and manages two radio stations: Radio Beta-RFI in Belgrade, in cooperation with Radio France Internationale, and Radio Sto Plus in Novi Pazar. It also runs the web portal Argus focused on the fight against corruption and organised crime. Its ownership is still in the hands of the founder journalists, who invested all profits in the development of the agency.
- Fonet with 22 employees (as of 2024), provides a special service on EU news (Euroservice).
- Tanjug Tačno was registered in 2020 and since March 2021, it uses the intellectual rights of now-defunct Tanjug, and continues to publish news under that brand. It is the largest of the three active news agencies, and had 208 employees and an annual revenue of 5.76 million euros as of 2024.

==== Defunct ====
- Tanjug was a state-owned news agency founded in 1945. It announced closure in 2015, which became effective in 2021. Tanjug's name is derived from Tito's resistance's "Telegraph Agency of the New Yugoslavia", and achieved international prominence in the 1970s, covering West, East and non-aligned countries' events – taking part in the Non-Aligned News Agency Pool, and ranking among the top 10 largest news agencies in the world with 48 correspondents, 900 employees, and 400 news items per day. In the 1990s, it became the main tool for the government's position. Journalists left for either newly established state news agencies in other post-Yugoslav countries, or for new private agencies Fonet (February 1994) and Beta (May 1994), that allowed media pluralism to persist in 1990s Serbia. Its photo archives, with 3.5 million negatives about the most important events in former Yugoslavia, Serbia and abroad, starting from the Second World War, remained the most important in the region and after the liquidation of the agency they were transferred to the Archives of Yugoslavia.

=== Online media ===
Freedom House reports around 200 online news portals in 2014, and 54% of Serbian residents with internet access. Internet media have long remained marginal in the Serbian media market. In 2009, the Nielsen survey reported that they accounted for only 1.6% of the total media revenue in the country. B92 website was launched in 1995, and the internet represented a useful alternative for news circulation during periods of radio bans by the state.

As of 2014, the most visited websites in Serbian (mainly on the .rs domain) are the Serbian version of Google followed by online editions of printed daily Blic, news web-portal of B92 broadcaster, news portal of printed daily Kurir and classifieds KupujemProdajem.

Serbia's internet domain shifted gradually from .yu (Yugoslavia) to .rs (Republic of Serbia) after 2008. The national authority on internet domains is the Serbian National Register of Internet Domain Names (Serbian: Registar nacionalnog internet domena Srbije, RNIDS).

== Media Organisations ==
=== Trade unions ===
Serbia has two national professional journalistic associations: the Journalists' Association of Serbia (Serbian: Udruzenje novinara Srbije; UNS) and the Independent Journalists' Association of Serbia (Serbian: Nezavisno udruzenje novinara Srbije, NUNS), often in conflict. NUNS has a regional affiliate in the Independent Journalists' Association of Vojvodina (NDNV). No organisation advocates for the rights of freelance journalists.

UNS was founded in Belgrade in 1881 and defended the autonomy of the media within the limits of the self-government ideology of the Yugoslav Communist Party during the socialist time. In 2009, NUNS launched criminal charges against those journalist who had been working in RTV Belgrade, RTV Novi Sad, as well as daily newspaper Vecernje Novosti and Politika in the 1990s, while UNS defended them as persons who "just did their job" and remains opposed to the re-examination of media behaviour in the 1990s.

In 2000, UNS declared 1,514 members, NUNS declared 1,410 members, while around 3,000 journalists remained unassociated. Today, UNS remains the main journalists' association in Serbia, with about 6,000 members, against NUNS' 2,400. Both associations are members of the International Federation of Journalists, and strive for the protection of the legal and social aspects of journalism, the promotion of free journalism and media pluralism, and the development of professional norms and ethical standards.

Serbia does not have a tradition of journalists' trade unions and media business organisations, as associations have been dealing with social protection in the past. Journalists in Serbia remain underpaid and underemployed, often without a regular contract and below the minimum wage. Journalists working in local media at risk of bankruptcy are particularly exposed, since they are left without social protection.

- In 2003, UNS established the Journalists Union of Serbia, with around 800 members, to draft a national collective agreement and help journalists bargain with media owners.
- The Association of Independent Electronic Media (Serbian: Asocijacija nezavisnih elektronskih medija, ANEM), is a business organisation of 28 radio stations and 16 television companies (national and local, big and small), plus other organisations, launched in 1993 to strengthen the independence of media non-affiliated with the government. It strives for the establishment of a politically independent legal framework, for an economically viable environment for the development of electronic media, and for the improvement of professional and technical standards in the media sphere. ANEM provides lobbying for the media laws, education of media staff, legal help, and technical support for its members.
- The Association of Local Independent Media ("Local Press") is the media organisation of the local print media, established in 1995 and with 25 members.
- Media Association (Serbian: Asocijacija medija) gathers some big publishers, including Vecernje Novosti, Ringier Serbia, Color Press Group, Politika newspaper and magazines, Press Publishing Group, Adria Media Serbia, Dnevnik-Vojvodinapress, Ekonomist, Vreme and VojvodinaInfo. It aims at improving professional standards in journalism (such as the Press Council) and securing the independence of its members from political and economic pressures.

=== Regulatory authorities ===
The regulation of the media sphere is a task for several agencies. The Republic Broadcasting Agency (RRA) was established in 2005, followed by the Republic Telecommunication Agency (RATEL), in charge of the telecommunications field. The print media is not regulated, but since 2010, the Press Council works as a self-regulatory body to ensure the implementation of the journalists' Ethical Code.

==== Republic Broadcasting Agency ====
The RRA is defined as an "autonomous legal entity", "functionally independent of any state organ, as well as of any organisation or person involved in the production and broadcasting of radio and TV programmes".

The RRA has taken over wide competencies formerly tasked to state bodies, including issuing broadcasting licences, which is legally conditioned to the lack of owners' affiliations to political parties and setting the rules during electoral campaigns or mourning periods. It shows the transformation of RTS into a public service broadcaster and appoints the managing board of RTS, which chooses its directors.

The independence of the RRA is formally guaranteed by a mechanism. Its Board members are elected by the Parliament, based on nominations coming from civil society organisations (the Culture and Media Committee of the National Assembly, the Assembly of the Province of Vojvodina, academia, NGOs, and the professional media community). Candidates cannot be state or party officials, nor have a vested interest in programming production or broadcasting.

However, the independence, accountability, and impartiality of the RRA, as well as its capacities, remain in doubt.. According to the European Journalism Centre, RRA is deemed not transparent enough, and recurrent squabbles over the nomination of its board have reduced its credibility in the eyes of the public.

The establishment of independent regulatory bodies in Serbia went through several issues. Subsequent amendments to the Broadcasting Law opened up new avenues for possible political pressures over the RRA, e.g. when nominees of the Parliament and government got a longer term mandate than the nominees of professional and civil society organisations. According to journalists, the RRA charges excessive and arbitrary license fees to broadcasters. Print and online media are exempt from license requirements.

==== Republic Telecommunications Agency ====
The Republic Telecommunications Agency (RATEL) was foreseen by the 2003 Telecommunications Law and started operating in 2005. It defines the conditions for radio frequency spectrum usage, the Radio Frequency Allocation Plan, allocates radio and TV frequencies, and monitors their usage.

== See also ==
- Media freedom in Serbia
- Censorship in Serbia
- Television in Serbia
- List of newspapers in Serbia
- Serbian culture#Serbian media
- Serbskija novini

== Bibliography ==
- Savićević, Miroslav (1995). "Television". The history of Serbian Culture. Rastko.
- Bjelica, Mihailo (1995). "Journalism and publicist writing". The history of Serbian Culture.
