= ASCA (news agency) =

Founded in 1969, ASCA is an Italian news agency based in Rome. It is owned by the Italian businessman Giancarlo Abete through Gruppo Abete (who also own a majority stake in APCOM).
