= Amalendu Kundu =

Indian journalist (died 2026)

- অমলেন্দু কুণ্ডু
- Died: 4 July 2026; Howrah, West Bengal, India
- Occupations: Journalist, author
- Employer: The Times of India
- Known for: Reporting on Sikkim and the Eastern Himalayas
- Awards: Kashiraj Pradhan Lifetime Journalism Award (2018)

Amalendu Kundu (Bengali: অমলেন্দু কুণ্ডু; died 4 July 2026) was an Indian journalist who reported on Sikkim and the Eastern Himalayan region for about five decades, including more than 40 years as the Sikkim special correspondent of The Times of India.

== Career ==
Kundu was from Howrah, West Bengal. Before moving to Sikkim, he worked as a teacher and as a staff reporter for the Kolkata-based newspaper Amrita Bazar Patrika.

In 1977, two years after Sikkim became a state of India, he was posted there as bureau chief of the news agency Hindusthan Samachar. He later joined The Times of India and served as its special correspondent in Sikkim for more than four decades while also contributing to other national publications. His reporting covered India's border relations with China, Nepal and Bhutan as well as politics in Sikkim and the Darjeeling hills.

== Writing ==
Kundu wrote several books. They include Standpoint Sikkim: Under the Dragon's Shadow, which deals with India-China relations, the Gorkhaland movement, the Doklam standoff and the political development of Sikkim.

== Recognition ==
In 2018, the Government of Sikkim gave Kundu the Kashiraj Pradhan Lifetime Journalism Award during celebrations of the state's 43rd State Day.

== Death ==
Kundu died on the evening of 4 July 2026 at his home in the Howrah Maidan area of West Bengal. He was in his eighties and had been ill with age-related conditions. His last rites were held the following day. Former Chief Minister of Sikkim Pawan Kumar Chamling said he had often relied on Kundu's reporting and analysis while in office and described his death as a loss for Sikkim as well as for journalism.
