= GHN =

GHN or ghn may refer to:

- G.hn, a networking standard
- GHN (news agency), a Georgian news agency
- Ghanongga language, ISO 639-3 ghn
- Global Heritage Network, for preservation of cultural sites
- Growth hormone 1
- Guanghan Airport, Sichuan, China, IATA code
