= Makfax =

Macedonian news agency

Makfax Макфакс
- Company type: Private
- Industry: News agency
- Founded: August 1992
- Headquarters: Skopje, North Macedonia
- Key people: Kristijan Landov
- Number of employees: >10
- Website: makfax.com.mk

Makfax (Macedonian: Макфакс) is an independent news agency in North Macedonia. It is the first private news agency in North Macedonia and the South East European (SEE) region, founded in 1992. Starting from May 1993, it has been broadcasting news continuously for more than 15 years.

The journalist Risto Popovski is the founder of the agency, whereas Kristijan Landov is the current editor-in-chief, since 2023.

Makfax delivers information on events to some news media in the country and the region. On its portal, accessibility-wise, Makfax offers two types of news. The free-access news are available to all visitors of the site and to all subscribers of the electronic (e-mail) packages. Foreign embassies and missions in North Macedonia are the users of the specialized service packages and news.

The agency is a member of the South East Europe Media Organization (SEEMO), an affiliate of the International Press Institute (IPI).

Makfax, as an online medium, has 304,730 registered visitors. According to some analyses, there are 771,328 unique visits per month and over 1,000,000 page views. Based on these numbers, the agency is one of the most visited Macedonian informative sites and a main source of news.

== Editorial staff ==
The editorial staff of the agency is composed of professional reporters, translators as well as organizers.
