= S. S. Apte =

Indian politician and journalist

Shivram Shankar Apte
- Born: 1907; Vadodara, British Raj
- Died: 10 October 1985 (aged 78)
- Other name: Dadasaheb Apte
- Education: LLB
- Known for: Vishva Hindu Parishad

Shivram Shankar Apte, also known as Dadasaheb Apte (1907 – 10 October 1985), was a founder and first General Secretary of the Vishva Hindu Parishad.

He worked as a journalist at United Press of India and later founded a news agency, Hindusthan Samachar.
