= In ½ h =

- Starring: Lucia Annunziata
- Opening theme: Twisted Nerve
- Country of origin: Italy
- Original language: Italian
- No. of episodes: N/A

Production
- Running time: 30 mins.

Original release
- Network: Rai Tre/Raisat Extra
- Release: 2005 – present

In ½ h (meaning "in half an hour", which is the running length) is an Italian television talk show hosted by the Italian journalist Lucia Annunziata. It is broadcast on Rai Tre every Sunday since 2005 and re-broadcast on Raisat Extra.
