= Agence Bénin Presse =

Official press agency of the government of Benin

Agence Bénin Presse (ABP) is the official press agency of the government of Benin.

ABP was established in 1961. The relevant laws governing it are Law No. 94-009 of 28/07/1994 and Decree No. 2005-790 of 29/12/2005.
