= STP-Press =

- Type: News agency
- Owner: Government of São Tomé and Príncipe
- Founded: 1985; 41 years ago
- Country: São Tomé and Príncipe
- Website: www.stp-press.st

STP-Press is the official news agency of São Tomé and Príncipe. It is headquartered in the capital city of São Tomé.

== History ==
It was founded in 1985 It is a member of the Aliança das Agências de Informação de Língua Portuguesa (ALP), Alliance of Portuguese-speaking News Agencies, formed in July 1996. and the Atlantic Federation of African News Agencies.
