= Pressclub Information Agency =

Bulgarian news agency

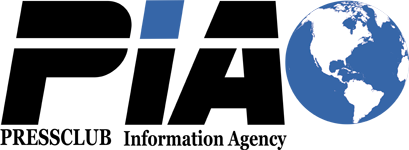
- Industry: News media
- Founded: Sofia (2008)
- Headquarters: Sofia, Bulgaria
- Products: Wire service
- Website: pianews.eu

Pressclub Information Agency (PIA) is a Bulgarian news agency.

== History ==
The Pressclub Information Agency (PIA) is one of the newest in Bulgaria. On December 8, 2008 it started as an information website.

The Pressclub Information Agency aims to provide their own content for Bulgarian and foreign electronic and print media - newspapers, magazines, radio, televisions, electronic media, central and regional media as well as government institutions and Nongovernmental Organizations (NGOs) in Bulgaria and Europe.

The Pressclub Information Agency covers political, social events and cultural life in Bulgaria and abroad. The Agency is independent of political parties and corporate interests.

For 3 years, the agency broadcast over 100 thousand posts to thousands of users. It managed to establish itself as an objective and independent electronic media and to gain the trust of its users.

== Opportunities ==
The agency actively takes advantage of various channels to reach their readers more easily. X is one of their main channels with a channel for emergency text messages. Moreover, the agency has a news page on Facebook.

The Agency provides its readers coverage of current events in text and video, with an option for readers to join the flow of short messages with their opinions, comments and / or additional information.
