= Via News Agency =

New agency based in Lisbon, Portugal

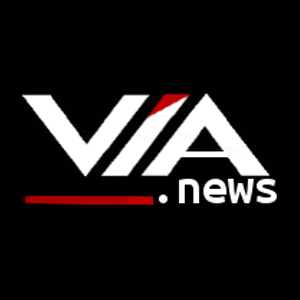
- Industry: News agency
- Founded: June 2015; 11 years ago
- Headquarters: Lisbon, Portugal
- Number of employees: 33
- Website: via.news

Via News Agency (VIANEWS) is a news agency established in June 2015 focusing on data journalism. It has journalists reporting from different countries on topics related to the stock market, business, companies, investment, and world news.

== History ==
Via News Agency was established in 2015. By 2016, it had 15 journalists from 10 countries and was covering major business and technology events in Lisbon such as the Web Summit. In 2017, it had 33 journalists covering the news from 30 countries, which grew to 45 journalists and 39 countries in 2018. The next year, it added a team covering the stock market and financial news.

In 2020, Via News Agency launched Via News Financial TV, a 24/7 live TV with constantly updated financial data. The stock market is now being reported in text and in real-time.

== See also ==
- List of news agencies
- "Company History". Via News.
