= Lucia Annunziata =

Italian journalist

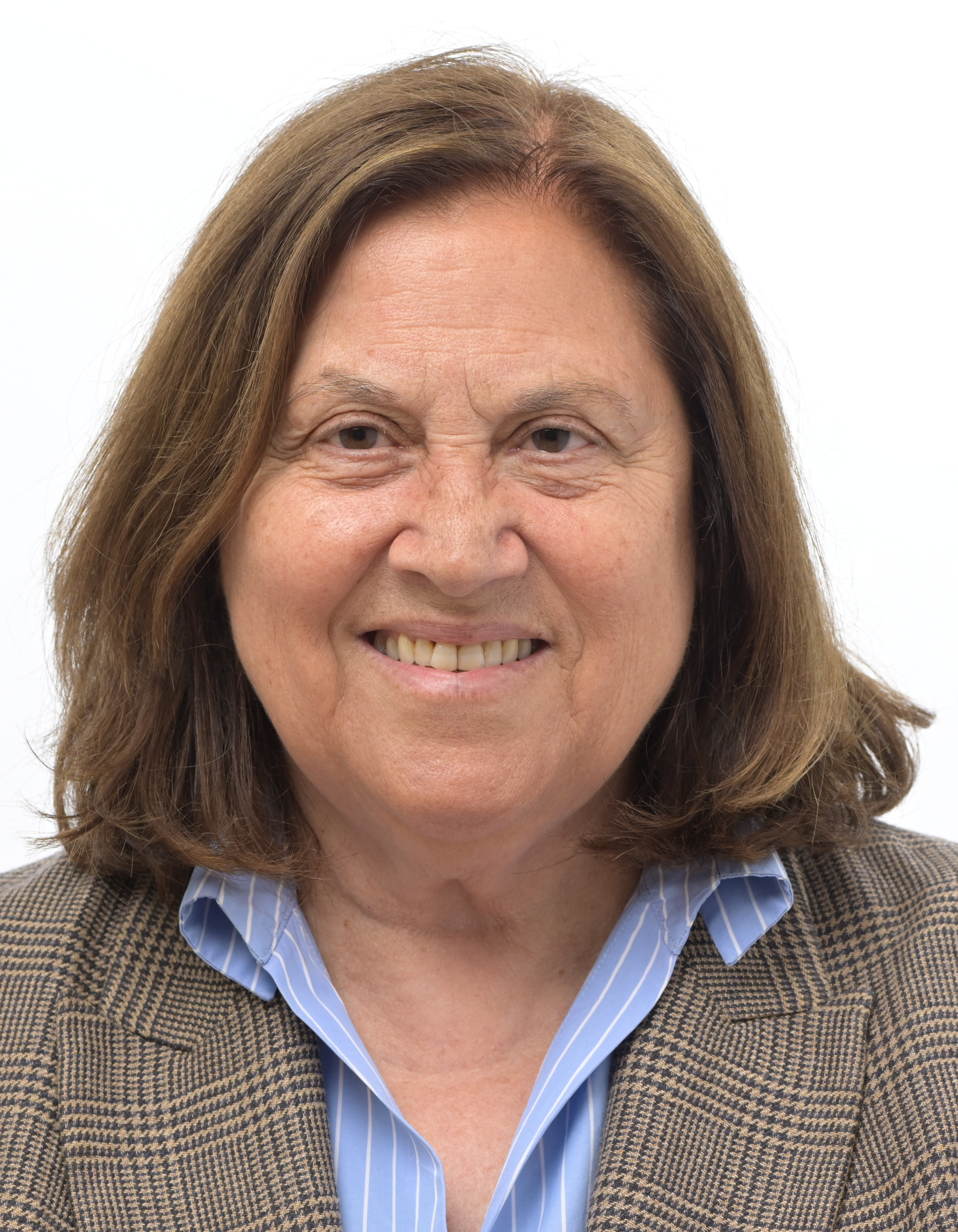
- Official portrait, 2024

Member of the European Parliament for Southern Italy
- Incumbent
- Assumed office 16 July 2024

Chairperson of RAI
- In office 13 March 2003 – 4 May 2004
- Preceded by: Paolo Mieli
- Succeeded by: Francesco Alberoni

Personal details
- Born: Lucia Annunziata; 8 August 1950 (age 76) Sarno, Italy
- Party: Democratic Party (since 2024)
- Spouse: Daniel Williams
- Children: 1
- Education: University of Salerno
- Occupation: Journalist • Politician

Lucia Annunziata (born 8 August 1950) is an Italian journalist and politician. She was chairperson of RAI between 2003 and 2004. Annunziata will be the Democratic Party top candidate in the Southern Italy constituency for the 2024 European Parliament election.

== Career ==
Born in Sarno (in the Salerno province), at the age of 13 she moved to Salerno, where she attended high school and university, obtaining a degree in History and Philosophy. In 1979 she became a professional journalist, working as a correspondent from the United States first for Il Manifesto, then for La Repubblica. In 1993 she won an International Fellowship from the Nieman Foundation for Journalism at Harvard. She then went on to work for the Corriere della Sera and finally for RAI (Italy's national public broadcasting company) in 1995 (with the "Linea Tre" program on Rai Tre); in August 1996 she became executive editor of the TG 3, although she resigned from the job at the end of November. In 2000, she became executive editor of the newborn news agency ApBiscom (subsequently renamed APCOM). She became Chairperson of RAI on 13 March 2003 and resigned on 4 May 2004; she was the second woman Chairperson of RAI (after Letizia Moratti in 1994). In 2005–2006, she hosted the interview program In 1/2 h for Rai Tre, in which she famously interviewed then Prime Minister Silvio Berlusconi. Currently, she works as columnist for La Stampa and as a panelist for The Washington Post. She received the America Award of the Italy-USA Foundation in 2014. She has been Chief Editor of the Italian-language version of The Huffington Post between 2012 and 2020. As of September 2020, she is a member of the Italian Aspen Institute.

== The Berlusconi interview ==
On 12 March 2006, in the middle of the electoral campaign for the Italian general election, Lucia Annunziata interviewed the then Prime Minister Silvio Berlusconi, who was running for a second term, on her television program In 1/2 h (In half an hour). During the interview, she asked pressing questions about the works of Berlusconi's administration, often interrupting the Prime Minister's statements, which annoyed him to the point that he stood up and left the room halfway through the program, thus cutting short the interview.

The political control board of RAI accused Annunziata of violating the Par Condicio, since that law states the interviewer should keep to a neutral stance during political interviews. She resigned from her job as executive editor of RAI in protest for Berlusconi's conflict of interest.

In 2025 she was chosen as an MEP to lead the European Commission's election observation team in Malawi. She was appointed by European Commission Vice-President Kaja Kallas.
