= Samachar =

Indian news agency

- Industry: News media
- Founded: February 1976
- Headquarters: India

Samachar (Hindi for "information") was founded in February 1976, after the merger of United News of India, Press Trust of India, Samachar Bharati and Hindusthan Samachar. The news agency was directly under the control of the government of India.

== Background ==
During the period of emergency, on 26 July 1975, the government of India took the decision to merge the four teleprinter news agencies of India and form a single nationalised news agency. The employees' unions of the four agencies supported the idea. Hence in February 1976, United News of India, PTI, Hindustan Samachar and Samachar Bharati were merged to form a single news agency, Samachar.

After the defeat of Indira Gandhi's government in 1977 election, the Kuldip Nayar Committee was formed to examine the structure of Samachar as a news agency.

On 14 November 1977, the committee recommended the independence of the four news agencies as they were before the emergency period.

Thus, on 14 April 1978, all four news agencies split from Samachar, and Samachar became the news portal of the Government of India.

== Bibliography ==
- Aggarwal, S. K. (1989). Media Credibility. Mittal Publications. ISBN 9788170991571.
- Jones, Derek, ed. (2015). Censorship: A World Encyclopedia. Routledge. ISBN 9781136798634.
- Kanung, Chitra (2001). Freedom Under Assault. A.P.H. Publishing Corporation. p. 114. ISBN 9788176482264.
- Kumar, Keval J. (2000). Mass Communication in India. Jaico Publishing House. ISBN 9788172243739.
- Mehta, D. S. (1979). Mass Communication and Journalism in India. Allied Publishers. ISBN 9788170233534.
- Sharma, Diwakar (2004). Mass Communication: Theory and Practice in the 21st Century. Deep and Deep Publications. ISBN 9788176295079.
- Shrivastava, K. M. (2007). News Agencies from Pigeon to Internet. Sterling Publishers Pvt. Ltd. ISBN 9781932705676.
