= Korea Newswire =

Press release distribution service in South Korea

- Type: Press release distribution service
- Industry: Public relations
- Founded: 2004
- Headquarters: Seoul
- Key people: Dongho Shin

Korea Newswire is a South Korean press release distribution service based in Seoul. It was established in 2004.

The company operates a Korean-language press release distribution platform and an English-language website. Since 2013, Korea Newswire has maintained a distribution partnership with Business Wire for international press release distribution.
