= Tanjug =

Defunct Serbian state-owned news agency

- Native name: Танјуг
- Company type: State-owned enterprise
- Industry: News media
- Founded: 31 October 1995 (Last form); 5 November 1943 (Founded)
- Defunct: 9 March 2021
- Headquarters: Obilićev Venac 2, Belgrade, Serbia
- Owner: Government of Serbia

Tanjug (/'tʌnjʊg/) (Serbian Cyrillic: Танјуг; sometimes stylized as TANJUG) was a Serbian state news agency based in Belgrade, which officially ceased to exist in March 2021. Since then, the Belgrade-based private company Tanjug Tačno has acquired the rights to use the intellectual property and trademarks of the former agency.

== History ==
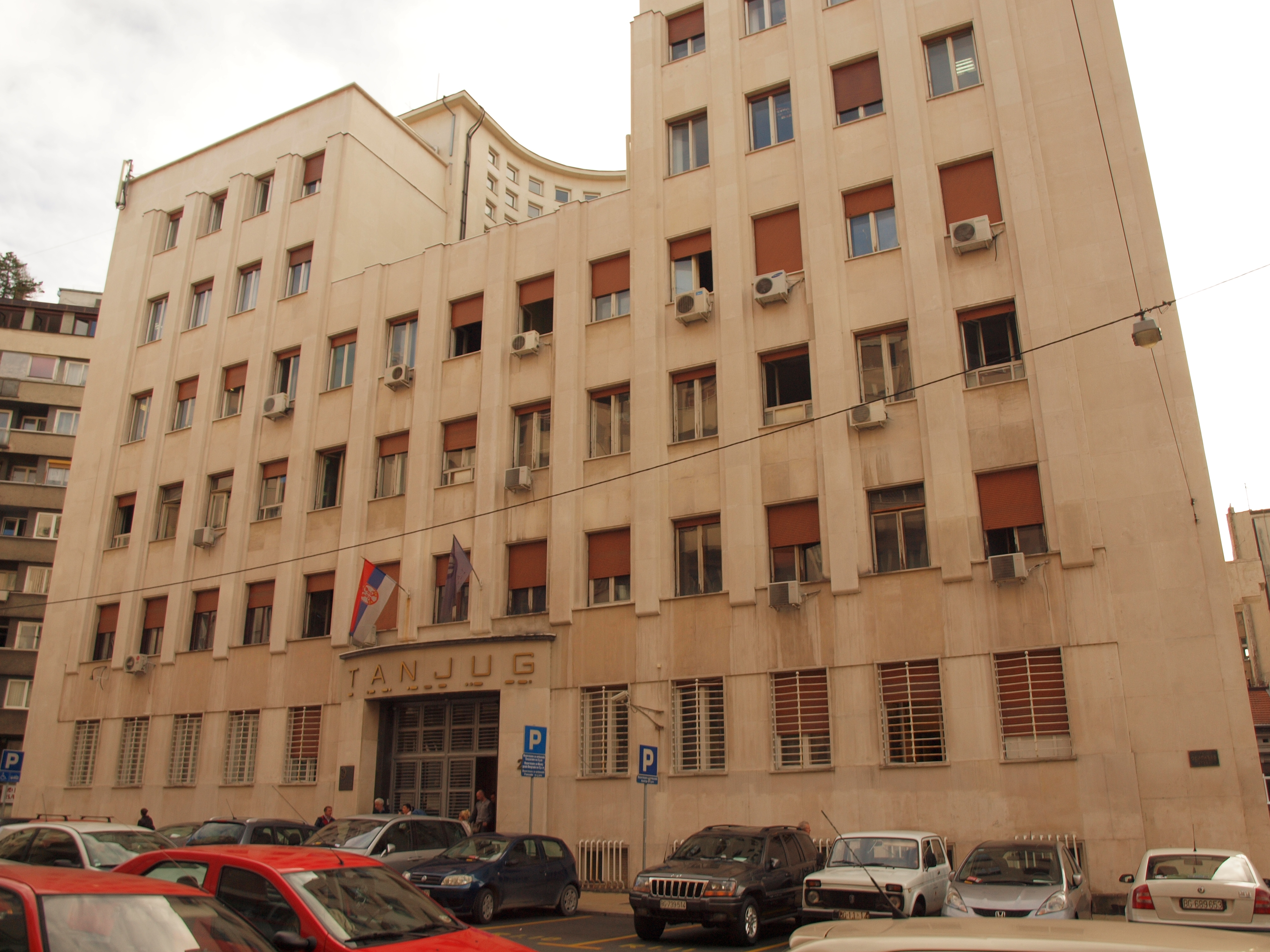
Tanjug Headquarters in Belgrade

Former Tanjug official logo

Founded on 5 November 1943 as Yugoslavia's official news agency, Tanjug is an acronym of its full original native name, Telegrafska agencija nove Jugoslavije ("Telegraphic Agency of New Yugoslavia").

From 1975 to the mid-1980s, Tanjug had a leading role in the Non-Aligned News Agencies Pool (NANAP), a collaborating group of news agencies of the Non-Aligned Movement (NAM). Tanjug professionals helped equip and train journalists and technicians of state media in other NAM countries, mainly in Africa and South Asia.

On 31 October 2015, according to media reports, Tanjug ceased its operations due to financial problems. The state secretary in the Ministry of Culture and Information dispelled these rumors, but acknowledged the agency's difficulties and said that a public–private partnership could be the solution. The agency continued working, signing contracts with state bodies and winning various public tenders and related work. Most of its employees were working on part-time contracts without guaranteed working rights.

On 9 March 2021, Tanjug officially ceased to exist. Since then, the Belgrade-based private company Tanjug Tačno, owned by Minacord Media (the majority owner being Željko Joksimović) and Radiotelevizija Pančevo, acquired the right to use the intellectual property and trademarks of the agency for 10 years.

== See also ==
- Media agencies in Serbia
