= GHN (news agency) =

- Type: news agency
- Founded: June 1, 2005
- Headquarters: Tbilisi, Georgia
- Official website: eng.ghn.ge

GHN is a Georgian news agency that covered the area of Georgia and Black Sea countries. Founder and General Director is Teimuraz Chumburidze. It's headquartered in Tbilisi, Georgia and publishes in Georgian, Russian and English.
