= Direkt =

Swedish financial news agency

Direkt is a Swedish financial news agency delivering financial news to mainly Swedish and Danish consumers. Direkt made a financial loss for each of the years 2005–2009, and in 2009 management announced aspirations for a profitable 2010.

== Ownership ==
Direkt was acquired from Bisnode in 2008. In 2011 Direkt was sold to Danish financial news agency RB-Børsen
