= Press Trust of India =

Indian news agency

The Press Trust of India Ltd.

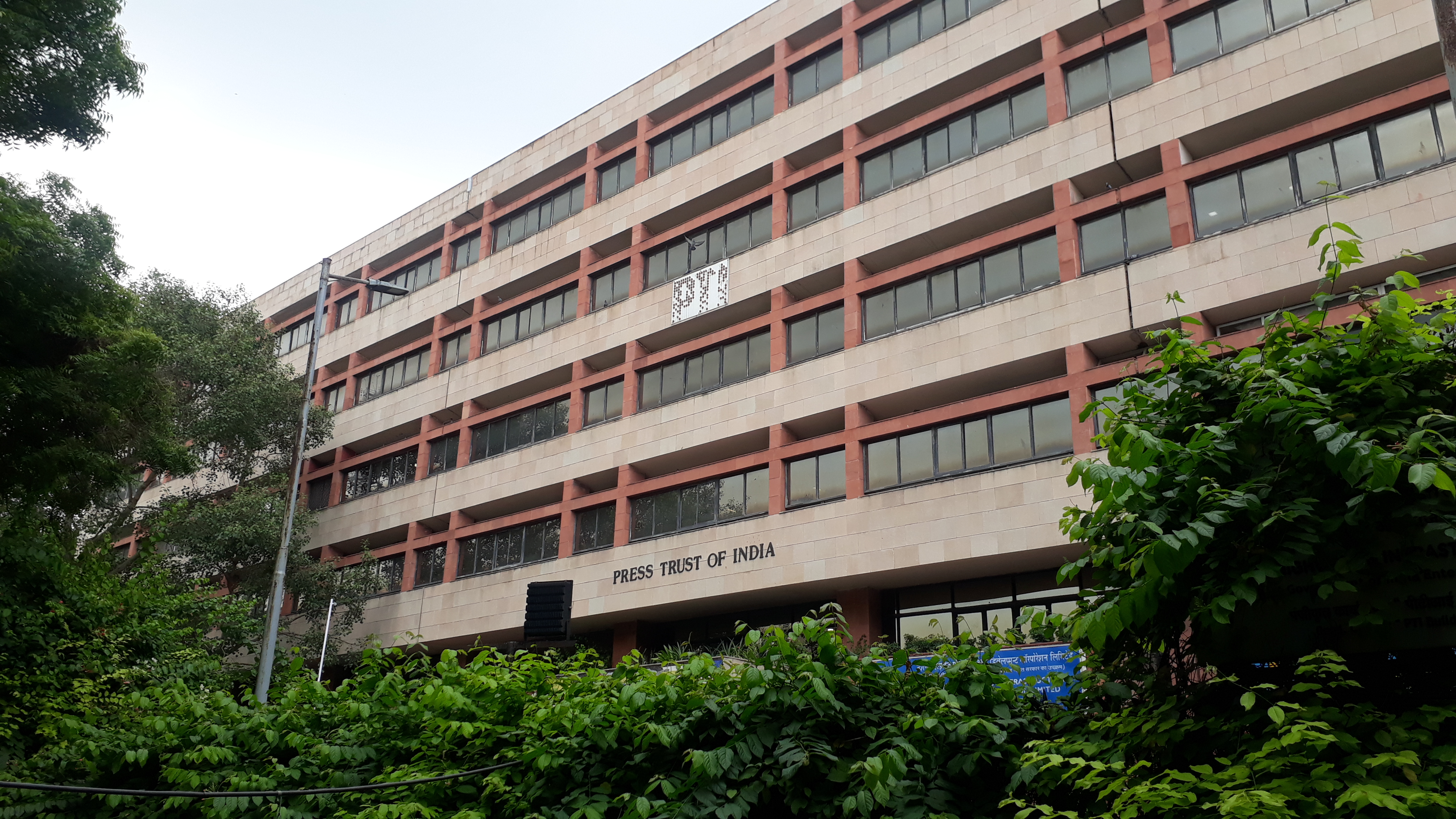
- PTI Head Office on Parliament Street, New Delhi
- Type: Non-profit cooperative
- Industry: News media
- Founded: 27 August 1947; 79 years ago
- Headquarters: PTI Building, 4, Parliament Street, New Delhi, India
- Area served: Worldwide
- Key people: Mahendra Mohan Gupta (Chairman); Vijay Joshi (Editor-in-Chief)
- Revenue: ▲₹1.73 billion (US$18 million) (2016–17-18)
- Number of employees: 1,000+ (2014)
- Divisions: PTI Bhasha; PTI Photo; PTI Graphics
- Website: www.ptinews.com

The Press Trust of India Ltd., commonly known as PTI, is the largest news agency in India. It is headquartered in New Delhi and is a nonprofit cooperative among more than 450 Indian newspapers. It has over 500 full-time employees as of 1 January 2022, including about 400 journalists. It also has nearly 400 part-time correspondents in most of the district headquarters of the country. PTI also has correspondents in major capitals and important business centres around the world. It was incorporated in Madras in 1947 with The Hindu's proprietor, Kasturi Srinivasan, as its Founding Chairman. It took over the operations of the Associated Press of India from Reuters in 1948–49. It provides news coverage and information of the region in both English and Hindi.

== Overview of PTI ==
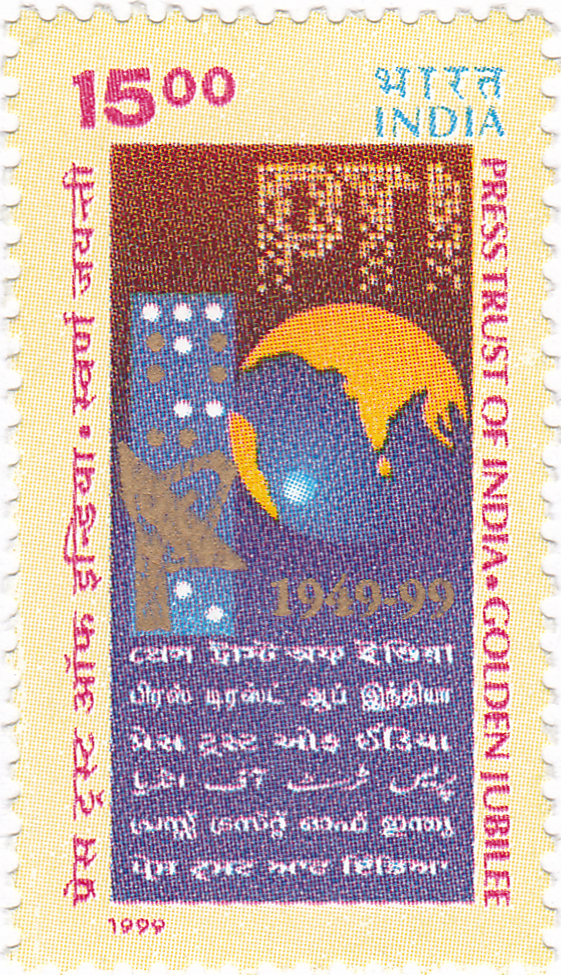
A 1999 stamp dedicated to the 50th anniversary of PTI, featuring its logo on top

PTI exchanges information with several other news agencies including 100 news agencies based outside India, such as Associated Press, Agence France-Presse, The New York Times and Bloomberg L.P. Major Indian subscribers of PTI include The Hindu, The Times of India, The Indian Express, Hindustan Times, The Statesman, The Tribune, News 18, NDTV, India Today, the All India Radio, Doordarshan, and The Wire. PTI has offices in Bangkok, Beijing, Colombo, Dubai, Islamabad, Kuala Lumpur, Moscow, New York City, London and Washington D.C.

Its current chairman is Mahendra Mohan Gupta. He is also the vice-chairman of ABP group.

== History of PTI ==
| Time | Event |
|---|---|
| 1905 | Birth of Associated Press of India (API) floated by K C Roy, often called the first Indian news agency |
| 1919 | Reuters takes over operations of API but still uses API credit line |
| 1945 | API registered as a private limited Indian company wholly owned by Reuters |
| 1947, 27 August | Press Trust of India incorporated in Madras, The Hindu's Kasturi Srinivasan becomes founding chairman. |
| 1949, 1 February | PTI begins news services, taking over operations from API but still maintains links with Reuters. |
| 1953 | PTI becomes a free agent, independent of Reuters |
| 1976 | PTI Economic Service is launched |
| 1976, February | PTI, UNI, Samachar Bharati, and Hindustan Samachar merge under pressure during emergency to become 'Samachar'. |
| 1978, April | PTI and the other three news agencies go back to their original units to restart independent news operations |
| 1980, July | PTI Feature Service launched |
| 1981, October | PTI Science Service launched |
| 1982, November | PTI launches Scan, on-screen news display service |
| 1984 | PTI service launched for subscribers in United States |
| 1985 | Computerisation of news operations starts PTI service launched for subscribers in UK |
| 1986, February | PTI-TV launched |
| 1986, April | PTI-Bhasha launched, making it bi-lingual, a concept started by Samachar Bharati |
| 1986, August | Experimental broadcast of news and pictures via Insat-IB begins, Computer system made fully operational |
| 1987, August | Stockscan I launched |
| 1987, October | PTI photo service launched |
| 1992, August | PTI Mag launched |
| 1993, August | PTI Graphics service launched |
| 1995, March | PTI launches StockScan II |
| 1996, February | PTI invests for the first time in a foreign registered Company, Asia Pulse, which provides an on-line data bank on economic opportunities in Asian countries |
| 1997, December | PTI introduces photo-dial up facility |
| 1999, March | PTI celebrates Golden Jubilee. PTI goes on Internet |
| 2003, September | PTI launches internet delivery of its news and photo services |
| 2007, July | PTI KU-Band VSAT system for delivery of its news and photo services launched |
| 2010, March | PTI launches NewsView for delivery of its news (.txt and .xml) and photo services |

== See also ==
- Asian News International, another major news agency based in Delhi
- Hindusthan Samachar
- Samachar
- United News of India
- United Press of India

== General and cited references ==
- Aggarwal, S. K. (1989). Media Credibility. Mittal Publications. ISBN 9788170991571.
- Jones, Derek, ed. (2015). Censorship: A World Encyclopedia. Routledge. ISBN 9781136798634.
- Kanung, Chitra (2001). Freedom Under Assault. A.P.H. Publishing Corporation. p. 114. ISBN 9788176482264.
- Kumar, Keval J. (2000). Mass Communication in India. Jaico Publishing House. ISBN 9788172243739.
- Mehta, D. S. (1979). Mass Communication and Journalism in India. Allied Publishers. ISBN 9788170233534.
- Sharma, Diwakar (2004). Mass Communication: Theory and Practice in the 21st Century. Deep and Deep Publications. ISBN 9788176295079.
