= KupujemProdajem =

Serbian classified ads website

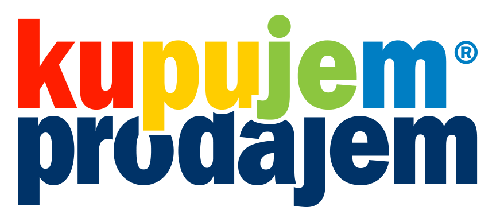
- Website type: Classified ads
- Available in: Serbian
- Founders: Quable BV, Netherlands
- Industry: Internet, Advertising
- Website: www.kupujemprodajem.com
- Launched: 2008; 18 years ago

KupujemProdajem is the most popular Serbian classified ads website. As of August 2023, this online platform has over 5.5 million active listings for sale, and more than 3 million registered users.

It is one of the most visited websites in Serbia.

== The beginning ==
KupujemProdajem was launched as the gadget news website, and shortly after shifted as the free classifieds with most of the ads in the category of music and musical instruments.
