= Charles-Louis Havas =

French writer (1783–1858)

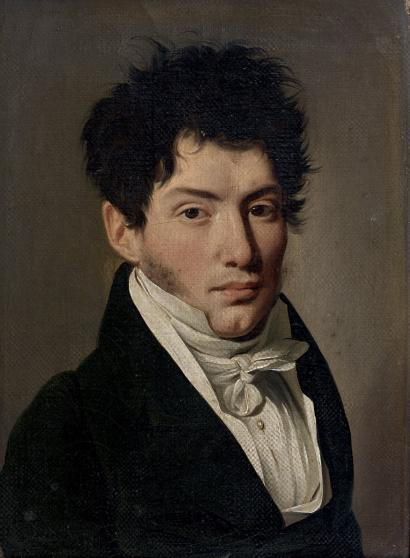
- Born: 5 July 1783; Rouen, Normandy, Kingdom of France
- Died: 21 May 1858 (age 74); Bougival, Seine-et-Oise, France
- Education: Lycée Pierre-Corneille
- Occupation: Businessman
- Known for: founder of the first news agency Agence France-Presse; Founder of advertising firm Havas)

Charles-Louis Havas (French pronunciation: [ʃaʁl lwi avas]; 5 July 1783 – 21 May 1858) was a French writer, translator, and founder of the first news agency Agence Havas (whose descendants are the Agence France-Presse (AFP) and the advertising firm Havas).

== Family background ==
His grandfather, Thomas-Guillaume-François Havas (1717–1795), married Marie-Elisabeth Eude, who, like him, was born and died in Pont-Audemer, in Normandy. The younger of their sons became vicar of the Saint-Étienne parish in Rouen, while the elder, a law graduate, served as royal inspector of the book trade in Rouen, overseeing the regulation of imported books and supervising printing assignments. Named Charles Louis Havas—like his own son would later be—he managed the landed estates of prominent Norman noble families. In 1780, in Rouen, he married Marie Anne Belard, the daughter of a local sugar refiner, with whom he had six children.

Havas Sr. enjoyed a reputation for exemplary integrity in Rouen. After the French Revolution, he shifted careers, entering the cotton trade and building a fortune by purchasing nationalized properties in Lyons-la-Forêt and the Pays d'Auge. However, the supply of cotton from Saint-Domingue was disrupted by the Haitian Revolution and the Whitehall Accord signed in 1794 between leading planters and England. As a result, Havas Sr. began dealing with international merchants to source cotton from Brazil. Under Bonaparte, when two discount counters were established in Rouen and Lyon by imperial decree on 24 June 1808, Havas Sr.'s name appeared on the list of prospective administrators—even though he had never applied for the role. Surprised, he expressed his astonishment in a letter to one of the Emperor's confidants. Some administrators considered his age to be quite advanced (55 years old) and his infirmities detrimental to the welfare of the institution. Others believed that he only sought the position as an honorable retirement.

== Early career in trade and public loans ==
Charles-Louis Havas became a business partner of Durand-Guillaume de Roure and married his daughter Jeanne on 4 February 1808 in Lisbon. They had three children: Jeanne Caroline (born 1808), Charles-Guillaume Havas (1811–1874), and Auguste Havas (1814–1889). The two sons would later succeed him in 1852.

Charles-Louis was particularly knowledgeable in this field, as his friend Ouvrard had pioneered a system five years earlier in which treasury bonds were effectively replaced by a covert and permanent form of debt.

The collapse of the First French Empire following the Battle of Waterloo brought down the value of French public loans. In 1815, at the age of 32, Charles-Louis Havas was forced to start over from scratch. His Bonapartist friend Gabriel-Julien Ouvrard, who had reentered the world of financial speculation, hired him as a Paris-based correspondent to translate and summarize content from major newspapers around the world. Charles Havas was fluent in English and German, and his wife spoke Spanish and Portuguese. During the 1820s, the couple ran an economic and financial intelligence office exclusively serving the banker Gabriel-Julien Ouvrard.

However, Ouvrard was once again ruined—this time definitively—after a 1825 government procurement tender in Bayonne, meant to supply troops for the Restoration's Spanish expedition, led to the Spanish procurement scandal. The 1825 stock market crash then completed the financial ruin of Charles-Louis Havas.

In 1835, he founded the Agence Havas, aware of their growing interest in international affairs, translated foreign newspapers and then sold them to the French national press, local businessmen, and the government. Recognizing that newspapers were not always accurate and often biased, he explored the concept of having his own correspondents in the field who would supply his agency with information. He died at Bougival.

Two of his employees, Paul Reuter and Bernhard Wolff, later set up rival news agencies in London (the Reuters News Agency founded in 1851) and Berlin (the Wolffs Telegraphisches Bureau founded in 1849) respectively. In order to reduce overhead and develop the lucrative advertising side of the business, Havas's sons, who had succeeded him in 1852, signed agreements with Reuter and Wolff, giving each news agency an exclusive reporting zone in different parts of Europe. This arrangement lasted until the 1930s, when the invention of short-wave wireless improved and cut communications costs. To help Havas extend the scope of its reporting at a time of great international tension, the French government financed up to 47% of its investments.

== See also ==
- Charles-Louis Havas (French)
