= CCTV+ =

Chinese video news agency

- Country: China
- Broadcast area: Worldwide
- Headquarters: Beijing, China

Programming
- Languages: English; Japanese; German; French; Spanish; Russian; Arabic

History
- Launched: 25 December 2010; 14 years ago

Links
- Website: www.cctvplus.com

CCTV+ is a video news agency specializing in video on demand based in Beijing belonging to the state-owned China Central Television televised news network.

== History ==
CCTV+ was launched in December 2010 covers stories from all over the world in six languages televised on over 1600 television channels in more than 70 countries.

== Broadcast ==
The broadcast of CCTV+ covers politics, finance, society, humanity, nature, science, and other fields at home and abroad.

== Cooperation ==
The cooperation of news organizations includes the Belt and Road News Alliance (BRNA), the Africa Link Union (ALU), the Socios Latinoamericanos (SAL) and the Pacific Island Partners (PIP) and the Newsharing.

=== Socios Latinoamericanos (SAL) ===
A news dissemination platform jointly launched by Socios Latinoamericanos (SAL) and CCTV International Video News Agency in April 2016, broadcast covered China and Latin America.

=== African Video Media Alliance (ALU) ===
The Africa Link Union (ALU) and CCTV International Video News Agency jointly cooperated in June 2016, mainly to promote the communication and dissemination between Chinese and African media.

=== Silk Road Video News Consortium (BRNA) ===
The Belt and Road News Alliance (BRNA) was established in May 2017 to cooperate with CCTV International Video News Agency to promote the development and construction of the Belt and Road, as well as to put all these official medias together to communicate.

=== Pacific Islands Partners (PIP) ===
Pacific Island Partners (PIP) and CCTV International Video News Agency were jointly established in April 2018 to promote resource sharing and program cooperation between the two countries.

=== Newsfield ===
Newsharing, initiated by CCTV International Video News Agency in 2016, mainly provides news information services for broadcast media and readers in China.

== Services ==
=== News Footage ===
CCTV+ provides twenty-four-seven multilingual news footage for global media.

=== Live Signal ===
CCTV+ provides live signal service to media organizations all over the world.

=== Archive ===
CCTV+ currently maintains approximately 270,000 news materials and 450,000 multilingual manuscripts.

=== Customized Service ===
CCTV+ provides tailored news products and services based on the specific needs of the clients, including news footage, a live signal and news programs.

== See also ==
- List of news agencies
