= Bernhard Wolff =

German media mogul

- Born: Bernhard Benda Wolff; 3 March 1811
- Died: 11 May 1879 (age 68); Berlin
- Education: Dr. Med. (University of Halle)
- Occupation: Businessman
- Known for: –editor of the Vossische Zeitung –founder of the National Zeitung –founder of Wolffs Telegraphisches Bureau

Bernhard Wolff (3 March 1811 – 11 May 1879) was a German media mogul. He was editor of the Vossische Zeitung, founder of the National Zeitung (1848–1938), and founder of Wolffs Telegraphisches Bureau (1849–1934), one of the first press agencies in Europe and one of the three great European telegraph monopolies until World War II, the other two being the English Reuters and the French Havas. The second son of a Jewish banker, Wolff lived and died in Berlin.

== Early years ==
Wolff was born in Berlin in 1811, the second son of a Jewish banker who lost his assets. Wolff was a physician by training (University of Halle) but soon ventured into journalism. At the beginning of his career, he had been editor of Vossische Zeitung, then one of the main newspapers in Prussia, created in 1721. When young, he adhered to liberalism, a “radical” ideology banned and little tolerated at the time. Monarchies predominated in Europe and absolutists were restored after Napoleon's defeat. In 1825, at just 14 years old, he founded a bookstore in Berlin that sold liberal and revolutionary pamphlets. In 1848, a revolutionary year on the continent, and with fellow liberals, Wolff founded another newspaper, the National-Zeitung, which would be published until 1938. Persecuted for his ideas, the medical journalist went into exile in France and found work with Charles-Louis Havas, who in 1835 founded the first news agency with that name, translating press reports into German into French.

== Founds News Agency ==
Wolff was fascinated with the type of business run by Havas and was inspired to do the same. Upon returning to Berlin in 1849, he founded the Telegraphische Correspondenz-Bureau (TCB “telegraph correspondence office”). Its headquarters were on Zimmerstraße, in the Berlin district of Friedrichstadt, close to where, a century later, the Berlin wall would pass. One of his partners in the venture was Georg Siemens, a cousin of engineer Werner Siemens, who two years earlier, in 1847, had founded a telegraph equipment company with engineer Johann Georg Halske. Thanks to this association, TCB ensured the necessary infrastructure for the transmission of information and obtained advantages in the use of the telegraph, which Siemens, in contracts with the Prussian government, spread throughout the kingdom. Germany was not yet a unified country. Its territory was divided into several kingdoms, principalities, electorates and city-states, such as Bavaria, Saxony, Hanover, Nassau, Hamburg, Frankfurt, Bremen and the largest and richest, Prussia. In 1849, the Prussian government established the state telegraph service, and Siemens connected Berlin to several cities in the kingdom, such as Hamburg, Cologne, Leipzig, Düsseldorf, Oderberg, Breslau (now Wrocław, Poland) and Stettin (today Szczecin, in Poland). Siemens would prosper in the German kingdoms and principalities by developing a simplified electrical telegraph standard, without using the Morse code adopted in the United States and the United Kingdom. In Paris, Wolff had worked with a fellow Jewish Prussian, also in exile for his political positions: Paul Julius Reuter. Wolff returned to his homeland. Reuter established himself in Aachen, West Prussia, operating a news service with homing pigeons to cover the section that the telegraph did not yet connect between Paris and Berlin. When the line was completed in 1851, Reuter moved to London and opened the agency that still bears his name: Reuters. From then on, the two agencies of the former colleagues began to compete vigorously for the European news market, especially in the field of financial information, banks and stock exchanges. In addition, competition was fierce with the French pioneer, the Havas agency, which soon conquered the Italian and Spanish markets, thanks to linguistic proximity and geopolitics, under the influence of Napoleon III.

== Joins Cartel ==
In 1856, Havas and Reuters signed an agreement to join efforts and exchange information about their respective domestic financial markets, passing on the results of trading sessions in their capitals to each other. Shortly thereafter, Wolff was invited to join the initiative, using data from the Berlin stock exchange. Three years later, the partnership was formalized with a cooperation agreement signed by the three companies, nicknamed "Grande Alliance" or Ring. On that occasion, Bernhard Wolff and Paul Julius Reuter were received in Paris by Charles-Guillaume and Auguste Havas (sons of Charles Havas and owners of the French agency since his death in 1858) on July 15, 1859. Three days later, at Havas' headquarters, at the Hôtel Bullion, the men signed an agreement, dividing Europe into exclusive areas for each agency. Thus, Havas would be the only company to distribute Wolff and Reuters dispatches in France and its territories (whether independent countries or colonial zones). Wolff would do the same with Havas and Reuters. Reuters would do the same with dispatches from the United Kingdom and the immense British Empire. In practice, by combining tariffs, operating rules and, especially, exclusive territories, the agencies established a true cartel. In this division of Europe, Wolff took less profitable areas in Scandinavia (Denmark and Sweden-Norway), Austria and its imperial territories such as Hungary, Croatia, Slovakia and Bohemia (now the Czech Republic), in addition to Russia (which then included Poland, Finland, Belarus and Ukraine). Wolff's expansion into Eastern Europe, where there were no strong newspapers or consolidated stock exchanges, fell short of what Havas and Reuters guaranteed, even with the territories of Holland, Belgium, Spain, Portugal, Italy and their respective domains of each of these kingdoms.

== Wolff’s agency goes public ==
On May 1, 1865, the German agency went public and became a public limited company with shares traded on the stock exchange. Among its main shareholders were bankers and the Prussian state, in addition to Bernhard Wolff himself. TCB adopted the name Wolffs Telegraphisches Bureau (WTB, or “Wolff's telegraph office”). The agencies sought to maintain loyalty to the cartel. German Eric Nikolai Ritzau, who had founded his eponymous agency in Denmark, established an office in Hamburg, where Reuters already had an operational base, and proposed to Paul Julius Reuter to partner with him to get dispatches for his London service. Reuter, already a British citizen, refused and passed the task on to Bernhard Wolff, who was responsible for Scandinavia in the cartel. Domestic competition did not take long to appear. In 1856, Bösman founded Bösmans Telegraphen Büro in Bremen. In 1862, Herold Depeschenbüro was formed, based in Frankfurt. In 1868, both Korrespondenz Hofmann in Munich and the Telegraphische Bureau Louis Hirsch in Berlin were born. Wolff maintained its leadership position, facilitated by the cartel, its association with Siemens and the Prussian state. Yet the cartel would not eliminate competition between partner agencies. In 1866, in retaliation for a Reuters incursion into Germany when the transatlantic-northern cable was installed, Wolff left the cartel and struck a redistribution agreement with the Western Associated Press, a United States agency, establishing a parallel system of news flow.

== Wolff allies his agency with the Prussian government ==
On June 10, 1869, in reaction to a commercial offensive by Paul Julius Reuter, who even tried to buy the company, Wolff concluded a strategic association with the Prussian government, under Chancellor Otto von Bismarck, and formally renamed his agency as Continental Telegraphen Compagnie (CTC), its news service being called Continental Telegraphen Bureau (CTB). But in the market and among journalists, it continued to be commonly referred to as Agency Wolff. At that time, Bismarck sponsored and started to subsidize the agency with resources from the Prussian treasury, worth 100,000 thalers a year. The “schism” within the cartel lasted for four years. When Wolff returned in 1870, a new and more ambitious agreement would be made: the division of the entire world into exclusive zones for each agency. The allocation of the world to European agencies was not arbitrary, nor was it simply political; it specifically followed the controls of the respective national capitals on installed telecommunications infrastructure. Reuters agreed that British companies should control most of the submarine telegraph cables. Wolff's share relied on the fact that Siemens had connected Central Europe with Russia, the Balkans, the Ottoman Empire and Persia. The terms of the 1870 agreement, of course, reflected the games of imperialism. Mirroring Franco-Germanic and Anglo-Germanic rivalries, a “precedence clause” imposed by Havas and Reuters on Wolff obliged Wolff to pay 25% of its annual profit and restricted its future expansion.

== Franco Prussian War ==
Six months after the global division by the agencies was celebrated, the Franco-Prussian War (1870-1871) broke out, during which the countries of Havas (France) and Wolff (Prussia) clashed. Caused by Bismarck (who edited a telegraphic dispatch from Wolff to manipulate French public opinion), France declared war on Prussia, which in turn invaded and occupied the neighboring country. Victorious, Prussia emerged strengthened and, in 1871, led the other independent German states to form a single unified nation-state: Germany. Although the conflict did not break the agreements irreversibly, it made the relationship between the French and German agencies more difficult, while strengthening the ties between Reuters and Havas.

== Personal ==
Bernhard Wolff

A friend, Karl Frenzel, wrote that Wolff had a fine, agreeable personality and a dignified reticence. Wolff had a broad, kindly face, was gray-haired, with sharp, lively eyes and a jovial grin. In his enterprises he demonstrated excellent people skills. Although never married, Wolff had a talent for friendship. He liked to entertain a wide circle of friends, especially the writers he published, in his old fashioned red living room in Berlin (Leipzigerstraße 58) and in the garden house of his home in Pankow. Wolff traveled regularly to the spa at Karlovy Vary for his health. At the end of his life, Wolff became ill with a stroke, gout, and kidney disease. Wolff's nephew, Dr. Jur. Ferdinand Salomon, was with him when he died and signed the official Berlin death record. In his will, Wolff ordered that the diary he kept every day, as well as other personal documents, be destroyed. Karl Frenzel was one of his pallbearers.

== Final years ==
In 1871, Bernhard Wolff retired from the management of the agency but remained proprietor of the National Zeitung, which his nephew, Dr. Jur. Ferdinand Salomon, took over at Wolff's death. From 1876 to 1878, another war, now in the Balkans (which led to the independence of Serbia, Montenegro, Bulgaria and Romania, hitherto vassals of the Ottoman Empire) generated a new conflict between the cartel's agencies. Contrary to what had happened in Italy two decades earlier, Havas and Reuters preferred to compete for coverage, and each sent their correspondents separately to a territory that was assigned to Wolff, "invading" the exclusive zone of the German agency. In 1879, Bernhard Wolff died after a long illness. The agency's management remained with its partners, representatives of the German press and banks. At the beginning of the 20th century, WTB was one of the largest news agencies in the world, with correspondents across Europe and more in America and Asia, and an estimated capital of 1 million marks. Wolffs Telegraphisches Bureau was the main source of foreign coverage for the German-language press and for Eastern Europe.
