= Mahendra Mohan Gupta =

Indian businessman and journalist

Mahendra Mohan Gupta is an Indian businessman and journalist. He is the owner of the Dainik Jagran group of Hindi newspapers published in India. The paper has a readership of 20 million people, mainly in state of Uttar Pradesh. The paper has 25 editions. They plan to launch an English language newspaper and a stand-alone tabloid.
