= APCOM =

APCOM is an important press agencies in Italy. Founded by the Italian journalist Lucia Annunziata in 2001, is based in Rome, Italy and has offices in Budapest, Brussels, Moscow and New York City. Since its foundation has an exclusive partnership with Associated Press for Italy and Switzerland and in 2008 has signed an agreement with RIA Novosti. Is an exclusive partner in Italy of MINDS International.

In 2003 was acquired by Telecom Media News, a division of Telecom Italia Media and provide report and news for La7 and MTV Italy news programmes, teletext and websites.

On 29 April 2009 the Italian businessman Giancarlo Abete (through Gruppo Abete) acquired a majority stake (60%) in Telecom Media News.
