= Lankapuvath =

Sri Lankan national news agency

- Type: News agency
- Country: Sri Lanka
- Founded: 1978
- Headquarters: Colombo
- Official website: http://www.lankapuvath.lk

Lankapuvath (Sinhala: ලංකාපුවත්) is Sri Lanka’s national and only news agency and is based in Colombo and consists of five partners, national dailies and main national electronic media institutions.

The share holders of Lankapuvath are Sri Lanka Rupavahini Corporation (SLRC), Sri Lanka Broadcasting Corporation (SLBC), Independent Television Network (ITN), and Associated Newspapers of Ceylon Limited (ANCL) well known as the “Lake House”. It is managed by a board of directors composed of the chairmen of above institutions.

Lankapuvath was established by Sri Lankan press baron, lawyer and one-time editorial managing director of the largest and most prominent newspaper group, The Lake House Group (which is the home of the Associated Newspapers of Ceylon), Esmond Wickremesinghe, the father of Sri Lankan Prime Minister Ranil Wickremesinghe. Ranil Wickremesinghe, during his neo-liberal United National Front government between 2001 and 2004, attempted to close down Lankapuvath citing cost-cutting, although this ended up not coming to fruition. Lankapuvath has provided comprehensive coverage of Sri Lankan and foreign news, drawing on its network of over 30 countries worldwide, via an active link with the National News Agencies of the Organisation of Asia-Pacific News Agencies (OANA Pool).

Lankapuvath distributes news and images via the Internet, TV, SMS and mobile phones. This output is supplemented by additional services aimed at catering to news requests from a demanding public. Lankapuvath operates 24 hours a day 7 days a week and mainly targets over 2 million Sri Lankans living overseas.

== See also ==
- Lankapuvath TV
