= Tačno d.o.o. =

Serbian news media agency

Tanjug Tačno
- Native name: Танјуг Тачно
- Company type: d.o.o.
- Industry: News media
- Founded: 17 November 2020; 5 years ago
- Headquarters: Belgrade, Serbia
- Key people: Manja Grčić (Director)
- Revenue: ▲€5.76 million (2024)
- Net income: ▼€0.26 million (2024)
- Total assets: ▼€2.05 million (2024)
- Total equity: ▲ (-€1.72 million) (2024)
- Owner: Radiotelevizija Pančevo (60%); Minacord media (40%)
- Number of employees: 208 (2024)
- Website: www.tanjug.rs

Tačno d.o.o., commonly referred to as Tanjug Tačno (Serbian Cyrillic: Танјуг Тачно), is a Serbian news media company that is headquartered in Belgrade, the capital of Serbia. The word 'Tačno' means 'correct' in English.

== History ==
The company Tačno d.o.o., owned by Minacord media (majority owner being Željko Joksimović) and Radiotelevizija Pančevo, was established on 17 November 2020.

On 9 March 2021, the company acquired 10-year rights of defunct Tanjug to use the intellectual property rights and trademarks of the agency. Since then, the company continues to publish news as news media agency under Tanjug brand.

== See also ==
- Media agencies in Serbia
