= United News of India =

Indian news agency

- Company type: Non-profit company
- Industry: News media News agency
- Founded: 19 December 1959; 66 years ago
- Founder: Dr. Bidhan Chandra Roy
- Headquarters: 9, Rafi Marg, New Delhi-110001, India
- Key people: R.P.Gupta (Chairman)
- Divisions: UNI Varta; UNI Urdu; UNI Kannada; UNI Photo
- Website: www.uniindia.com www.univarta.com www.uniurdu.com

United News of India, abbreviated as UNI, is a multilingual news agency in India. It was founded On 19 December 1959 as an English news agency. Its commercial operations were started from 21 March 1961. With its Univarta, a Hindi news service, UNI became one of the multilingual news service in the world. In 1992, it started its Urdu news service and hence became the first news agency to provide Urdu news. Currently, it is the second largest news agency in India, supplying news in English, Hindi, Urdu and Kannada languages. Its news bureaus are present in all state capitals and major cities of India.

== Background ==
Press Council of India (PCI) in its first Press Commission report (1952–1954) emphasised on the importance of second news agency so that they can act as corrective to each other. But even after the support of PCI, United Press of India collapsed in 1958, due to financial problems. So some leading newspapers felt the need of a second news agency along with Press Trust of India. This led to the formation of United News of India under Dr. Bidhan Chandra Roy, sponsored by eight leading newspapers The Hindu, The Times of India, The Statesman, Amrita Bazar Patrika, Hindustan Times, Hindustan Standard, Deccan Herald and Aryavarta.

== Initial period (1961 – 1975) ==
In its starting days, the company had to use old United Press of India teleprinters, that were rusted due to disuse since 1958. The company increased its capacity from 13 teleprinters in 1961 to 408 by the end of 1975. In 1971, the company's revenue was Rs. 54.31 lakh, which increased to Rs. 67.73 lakh in 1974 and Rs. 87.14 lakh in 1975. UNI had 5 staff members when it started its operation, but the number expanded to 697, with 139 journalists, 392 non-journalists, and 166 stringers, by the end of 1975.

UNI introduced many innovative methods which led to an increase its popularity. In 1968, it introduced a weekly backgrounder service for current topics which was well-documented, with in-depth background knowledge. In 1970, it gave a new dimension to the field of agricultural journalism by introducing UNI agriculture news and feature service. Many other schemes were successfully launched like Financial and Commercial service, for reporting Indian and foreign markets, UNI Airmail News service (1971), and was the first to give a full-time science correspondent in the field of science reportage.

For world news, UNI collaborated with Associated Press (USA), Deutsche Press-Agentur (West Germany), Agenzia Nazionale Stampa Associata (Italy), Agerpress (Rumania) and many others. Currently it is having news sharing agreement with Sputnik, Xinhua and Qatar News Agency (QNA).

== Emergency period (1975 – 1978) ==
During the period of emergency, on 26 July 1975, Indira Gandhi government decided to form a single entity by merging the four teleprinter news agencies of India. The employees' unions of the four agencies passed resolutions accepting the idea of forming a single news entity. Hence in February 1976, UNI was merged along with PTI, Hindustan Samachar and Samachar Bharati to form a new identity Samachar. After the defeat of Indira Gandhi's government in 1977 election, Kuldip Nayar Committee was formed by the new government to examine the functioning of Samachar, taking into consideration the freedom of the press and independence of the news agency. On 14 November 1977, the committee recommended the creation of two news agencies Varta and Sandesh by restructuring Samachar. Contrary to the committee's recommendations, Samachar was made to split and the merger of all four agencies was undone. Thus on 14 April 1978, UNI was revived again along with the other three news agencies.

== Post Emergency period (1978 – Present) ==
UNI in the post-emergency period, saw a growth in its subscribers. In January 1979, UNI's Financial Services (UNIFIN) was launched to provide global coverage of the financial and commodity markets from Wall Street and NASDAQ to European and Asian markets. UNIFIN also includes important political stories that affect the financial world.

In May 1982, UNI launched its Hindi service, UNIVarta. This was followed by the launch of Urdu news service on 5 June 1992. It became the first and only news agency in the world to supply news in Urdu on the teleprinter. Post 2005, its communication network is more than 90,000 km in India and the Persian Gulf region. It has correspondents in all major world cities. It has collaboration agreements with several foreign news agencies including Reuters.

Many other initiatives have been taken by UNI. It was the first news agency to start UNI Photo service, UNI Graphics. Currently it offers many services like UniDarshan for news clips and features for Doordarshan (launched in July 1986), UNICON (UNI Economic service, launched in 1979), UNEN (UNI Energy News service, launched in September 1980), UNI Agriculture service (launched in 1967), UNI Backgrounder service (launched in 1968), UNI Features, UNISCAN, UNIStock, UNIFIN (launched in January 1979) etc.

== Governance ==
UNI is registered as a non-profit company under section 25 of the Indian Companies Act. It is owned by the group of newspapers that have bought shares to run them. Newspapers elect the board of directors which are headed by a chairman. The chairman is the main authority in policy making of the news agency. The Board, headed by the chairman, consists of representatives of prominent newspapers as well as public figures.

== Bibliography ==
1. Shrivastava, K. M. (2007). News Agencies from Pigeon to Internet. Sterling Publishers Pvt. Ltd. ISBN 9781932705676.
2. Mehta, D. S. (1979). Mass Communication and Journalism in India. Allied Publishers. ISBN 9788170233534.
3. Kumar, Keval J. (2000). Mass Communication in India. Jaico Publishing House. ISBN 9788172243739.
4. Aggarwal, S. K. (1989). Media Credibility. Mittal Publications. ISBN 9788170991571.
5. Kanung, Chitra (2001). Freedom Under Assault. A.P.H. Publishing Corporation. p. 114. ISBN 9788176482264.
6. Jones, Derek, ed. (2015). Censorship: A World Encyclopedia. Routledge. ISBN 9781136798634.
7. Sharma, Diwakar (2004). Mass Communication: Theory and Practice in the 21st Century. Deep and Deep Publications. ISBN 9788176295079.
