= Karl Frenzel (writer) =

German novelist, essayist and theatre critic

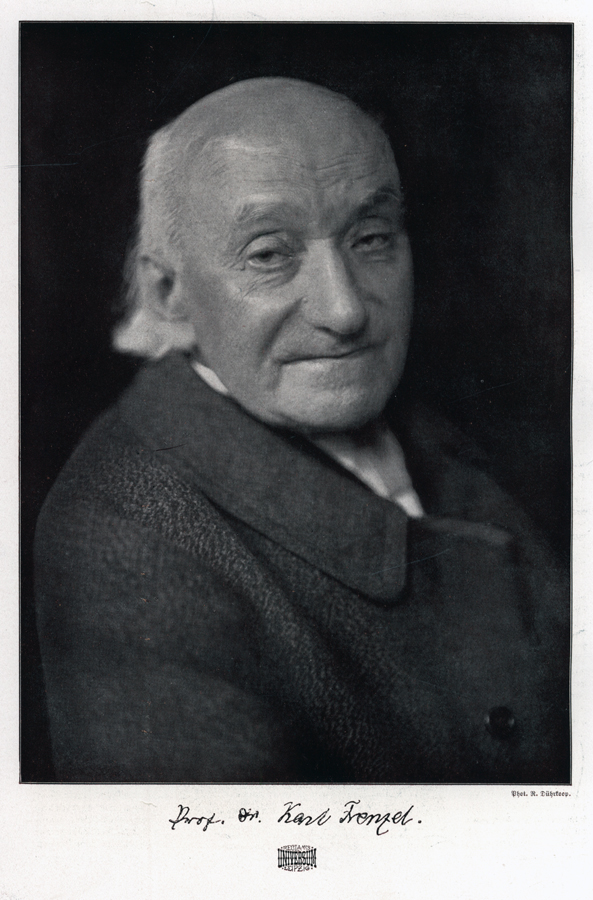
Karl Frenzel (Schriftstelle)

Karl Wilhelm Theodor Frenzel (6 December 1827 – 10 June 1914) was a German novelist, essayist and theatre critic.

== Life ==
Born in Berlin as son of an innkeeper, Frenzel studied here since 1849 philology, philosophy and history, finished his studies in 1853 with a doctorate and worked first full-time as teacher at the Friedrich- and Dorotheenstädtische Realschule. At the same time Frenzel published in different magazines; already before 1850 he had published poems under the pseudonym Carl Frey in the Berliner Figaro and in 1848 he participated in the Freischärler of Louise Aston. In 1853 he turned to his idol Karl Gutzkow, whom he admired as a versatile writer and first-class critic, and became one of the most important contributors to Gutzkow's conversations at the domestic hearth. In 1863 he took over the direction of this journal and also published the last volume in 1864. In 1861 he joined the editorial staff of the liberal Berlin National-Zeitung, of which he was head of the feuilleton and theatre critic until 1908. Along with Theodor Fontane, who became a theatre critic for the Vossische Zeitung in 1870, Frenzel was regarded by his contemporaries as Berlin's authoritative theatre critic. His influential position was unchallenged for a long time and only weakened when Gerhart Hauptmann and others were joined by Naturalism, whom Frenzel, in contrast to Fontane, condemned and fought against. His stage reviews were published under the title: Berliner Dramaturgie collected.

On Frenzel's 70th birthday in 1897 the Prussian state awarded him the title of professor. Frenzel died on 10 June 1914 at 86 in his Berlin apartment at Dessauer Straße 19 and was buried in the Invalids' Cemetery on Scharnhorststraße. The burial site no longer exists.

== Artistic work ==
Already in 1857 Frenzel had a drama printed (Attila, only printed as a manuscript), but for good reasons he did not follow the career of a theater poet. He opened his independent literary career in 1859 with a collection of historical essays Dichter und Frauen ("Poets and Women"), which was soon followed by further collections of essays and reviews, novel and novella volumes. Frenzel initially turned to the genre of the historical novel and wrote a number of narrative works, the plot of which was preferably set in the 18th century, during the period of the Enlightenment with its then predominant French education. Later, Frenzel also wrote novels from the present, in which the growing imperial capital Berlin is the main setting.

Temporarily (1866-67) Frenzel was also co-editor of the Deutsches Museum founded by Robert Eduard Prutz. In 1874 he played a decisive role in founding the Deutsche Rundschau of his friend Julius Rodenberg. Many of his novels and novellas were published in this monthly, and he was also a speaker for the Berlin stage for many years. Other activities were also of importance for the literary life of Berlin in the last third of the 19th century: he was, for example, a co-founder of the Verein Berliner Presse, an important member of the Berlin branch of the Deutsche Schillerstiftung and a sought-after speaker for various cultural events. He delivered the eulogy at Theodor Fontane's funeral in 1898.

== Work ==
- Dichter und Frauen. Studies, (Hannover 1859–66, 3 vols.)
- Melusine.Novel, (Breslau 1860)
- Vanitas. A novel in 6 books, (Breslau 1861, 3 vols.)
- Die drei Grazien. A novel in three books, (Breslau. 1862)
- Büsten und Bilder. Studies. (Hannover 1864)
- Papst Ganganelli. A historical novel in 5 books, (Berlin 1864, 3 vols.)
- Watteau. A novel (Hannover 1864, 2 vols.)
- Charlotte Corday. Historical novel, (Hannover 1864)
- Auf heimischer Erde. New novellas (Berlin 1866)
- Deutsche Fahrten (Berlin 1868)
- Freier Boden. Historical novel in 3 books, (Hannover 1868, 3 vols.)
- Neue Studien (Berlin 1868)
- Im goldenen Zeitalter. Novel, (Berlin 1870, 4 vols.)
- La Pucelle. Novel, (Hannover 1871, 3 vol.)
- Geheimnisse. Novellas, (Leipzig 1872, 2 vols.)
- Lucifer. Ein Roman aus der Napoleonischen Zeit (Leipz. 1873, 5 vols.)
- Deutsche Kämpfe (Hannover 1874)
- Sylvia. Novel (Leipzig 1875, 4 vols.)
- Lebensrätsel, Novellas (Leipzig 1875, 2 vols.)
- Renaissance und Rococo. Study. (Berlin 1876)
- Berliner Dramaturgie (Hannover 1877, 2 vols.)
- Frau Venus. Novel, (Berlin 1880, 2 vols.),
- Die Geschwister. Novel in four books. (Berlin 1881, 4 vols.)
- Das Abenteuer. Narrative. (Leipzig 1882)
- Chambord. Novella. (Berlin 1883)
- Zwei Novellen (Leipzig 1884)
- Der Hausfreund (Leipzig 1884)
- Nach der ersten Liebe (Berlin 1884, 2 vols.)
- Geld. Novella, (Berlin 1885)
- Des Lebens Ueberdruß. Eine Berliner Geschichte (Minden 1886). Digitalisat Zentral- und Landesbibliothek Berlin
- Dunst. Novel. Deutsche Verlagsanstalt, Stuttgart and Leipzig 1887.
- Schönheit. Novella, (Berlin 1887)
- Erinnerungen und Strömungen, (Leipzig 1887)
- Wahrheit. Novella, (Berlin 1890)
- Gesammelte Werke (Leipzig 1890–92, 6 vols.)
- Die Berliner Märztage und andere Erinnerungen (Leipzig 1912)

== Literature ==
- Wilhelm Blos: Dunst. Zur Karakteristik unserer modernen deutschen Romanliteratur. In Die neue Zeit. Revue des geistigen und öffentlichen Lebens. 6(1888), issue 1, pp. 34–41. numerised
- Ernst Wechsler: Karl Frenzel. Leipzig 1891. (Die moderne Litteratur in biographischen Einzel-Darstellungen.
- Horst Ribeiro: Der Theaterkritiker Karl Frenzel. o. O.: [1953]. 445 gez. Bl.; [Maschinenschr. vervielf.] (Berlin, Freie Univ., Phil. F., Diss. v. 6. Nov. 1953)
- Hartmut Baseler: Gerhart Hauptmanns soziales Drama „Vor Sonnenaufgang“ im Spiegel der zeitgenössischen Kritik. Eine rezeptionsgeschichtliche Modellanalyse: Karl Frenzel, Theodor Fontane, Karl Bleibtreu, Wilhelm Bölsche. o. O.: 1993. 565 S. (Kiel, Univ., Diss., 1993)
- Wolfgang Rasch (ed.): "Ihm war nichts fest und alles problematisch". Karl Frenzels Erinnerungen an Karl Gutzkow. Mit einigen ungedruckten Briefen Gutzkows an Frenzel. Bargfeld, 1994. (Edition im Luttertaler Händedruck. 6) ISBN 3-928779-07-9
- Nina Peters: „Sie kennen dies Gebiet wie die Friedrichstrasse.“ Der Schriftsteller Karl Frenzel und seine Beziehung zu Karl Gutzkow. In Berliner Hefte zur Geschichte des literarischen Lebens. Berlin. Issue 6, 2004, pp. 85–104. ISSN 0949-5371
