= Wolffs Telegraphisches Bureau =

First news agency in Germany

Bernhard Wolff

Wolffs Telegraphisches Bureau W.T.B. (official: Continental-Telegraphen-Compagnie Wolff’s Telegraphisches Büro (Berlin)) (1849–1934) was the first news-agency in Germany.

W.T.B. was founded by the German Bernhard Wolff (1811–1879), the editor of the Vossische Zeitung and founder of the National Zeitung (1848–1938). After the telegraph technology was opened for private messages, Wolff published the first stock exchange list, telegraphed from Frankfurt am Main and London, in his newspaper, the National Zeitung, in 1849. Due to the high costs, he agreed with other Berlin newspaper publishers and private individuals to jointly receive stock market news. Thus, on November 27, 1849, the "Telegraphic Correspondence Bureau (B. Wolff)" was founded, later renamed "Wolff's Telegraphic Bureau" (W.T.B.). It was one of the first press agencies in Europe and one of the three major European telegraph news monopolies until the World War II-era, along with the British Reuters and the French Havas.

From 1874 it was owned by the Continental Telegraph Company.

World War I resulted in W.T.B. being cut off from many of its international sources and clients due to the cutting of German undersea cables by the Allies. The agency came under the control of the German government from 1917 to 1919 and then declined during the economic turmoil of the Weimar Republic, losing influence outside of Germany to competitors Reuters and Havas.

The news agency came to an end, when it was forced to merged with Hugenberg's Telegraph Union. The merger formed the Nazi government-controlled propaganda news agency Deutsches Nachrichtenbüro in 1933.

== Literature ==
- Dieter Basse: Wolff's Telegraphisches Bureau 1849 bis 1933. Agenturpublizistik zwischen Politik und Wirtschaft. K. G. Saur Verlag, München / New York 1991, ISBN 3-598-20551-1 (Dissertation, Universität Münster; Reihe: Kommunikation und Politik, Band 21).
- Jansen, Marek (2022). Der Nachrichtenmarkt in der Industriellen Revolution. Zur Entwicklung und rechtlichen Gestaltung des Nachrichtenmarktes im Kontext von Wolff's Telegraphischem Bureau (1849–1914) (Dissertation). Rechtsordnung und Wirtschaftsgeschichte. Tübingen: Mohr Siebeck. ISBN 978-3-16-159353-6. Universität Bonn, 2020
- Rudolf Stöber: Deutsche Pressegeschichte. Von den Anfängen bis zur Gegenwart. 2., überarbeitete Auflage. UVK-Verlags-Gesellschaft, Konstanz 2005, ISBN 3-8252-2716-2 (= UTB 2716).
