= Beta News Agency =

Serbian news media agency

- Native name: Новинска агенција Бета
- Industry: News media
- Founded: 18 March 1992; 34 years ago
- Headquarters: Belgrade, Serbia
- Key people: Radomir Diklić (Director)
- Revenue: ▼€0.81 million (2023)
- Net income: ▼€0.01 million (2023)
- Total assets: ▼€0.36 million (2023)
- Total equity: ▲€0.11 million (2023)
- Owner: See ownership structure
- Number of employees: 44 (2023)
- Website: beta.rs

The Beta Press d.o.o., or more commonly the Beta News Agency (Serbian Cyrillic: Новинска агенција Бета), is a Serbian news media agency headquartered in Belgrade, the capital of Serbia. It was established in 1992.

== History ==
It was established on 19 March 1992 with aim to "provide full and objective coverage of events in the country (Serbia) and the region of Southeast Europe".

In 2000, the agency was fined by the government (the Federal Republic of Yugoslavia under Slobodan Milošević) for publishing anti-establishment materials. The agency was fined 150,000 dinars (approx. US$12,860 or €13,630 at the time), and the agency's director and chief editor were each fined 80,000 dinars (approx. US$6,860 or €7,270 at the time). The fines were denounced by Reporters Without Borders. Over the time, it has received funds from the National Endowment for Democracy.

== Ownership ==
The following organizations and individuals compose the ownership structure (as of 30 April 2025):

- Radomir Diklić (12.5%)
- Branislava Nikšić (12.5%)
- Ljubica Marković (12.5%)
- Julija Bogoev-Ostojić (12.5%)
- Dušan Reljić (12.5%)
- Dragana Janjić (12.5%)
- Media Investment Loan Fund (6.25%)
- Beta Press d.o.o. (6.25%)
- Ivan Cvejić (6.25%)
- Zlata Kureš (6.25%)

== See also ==
- Media agencies in Serbia
