= News agency =

News gathering organization

A news agency (Note: A news agency may also be referred to as a wire service, newswire, or news service.) is an organization that gathers news reports and sells them to subscribing news organizations, such as newspapers, magazines and radio and television broadcasters. Although there are many news agencies around the world, three global news agencies, the Associated Press (AP), Reuters, and Agence France-Presse (AFP) have offices in most countries of the world, cover all areas of media, and provide the majority of international news printed by the world's newspapers. All three began with and continue to operate on a basic philosophy of providing a single objective news feed to all subscribers. Jonathan Fenby explains the philosophy:

To achieve such wide acceptability, the agencies avoid overt partiality. Demonstrably correct information is their stock in trade. Traditionally, they report at a reduced level of responsibility, attributing their information to a spokesman, the press, or other sources. They avoid making judgments and steer clear of doubt and ambiguity. Though their founders did not use the word, objectivity is the philosophical basis for their enterprises – or failing that, widely acceptable neutrality.

Newspaper syndicates generally sell their material to only one client in each market, while news agencies distribute news articles to all paying parties.

== History ==
Only a few large newspapers could afford bureaus outside their home city; they relied instead on news agencies, especially Havas (founded 1835) in France—now known as Agence France-Presse (AFP)—and the Associated Press (founded 1846) in the United States. Former Havas employees founded Reuters in 1851 in Britain and Wolff in 1849 in Germany. In 1865, Reuter and Wolff signed agreements with Havas's sons, forming a cartel designating exclusive reporting zones for each of their agencies within Europe. For international news, the agencies pooled their resources, so that Havas, for example, covered the French Empire, South America and the Balkans and shared the news with the other national agencies. In France the typical contract with Havas provided a provincial newspaper with 1,800 lines of telegraphed text daily, for an annual subscription rate of 10,000 francs. Other agencies provided features and fiction for their subscribers.

In the 1830s, France had several specialized agencies. Agence Havas was founded in 1835 by a Parisian translator and advertising agent, Charles-Louis Havas, to supply news about France to foreign customers. In the 1840s, Havas gradually incorporated other French agencies into his agency. Agence Havas evolved into Agence France-Presse (AFP). Two of his employees, Bernhard Wolff and Paul Julius Reuter, later set up rival news agencies, Wolffs Telegraphisches Bureau in 1849 in Berlin and Reuters in 1851 in London. Guglielmo Stefani founded the Agenzia Stefani, which became the most important press agency in Italy from the mid-19th century to World War II, in Turin in 1853.

The development of the telegraph in the 1850s led to the creation of strong national agencies in England, Germany, Austria and the United States. But despite the efforts of governments, through telegraph laws such as in 1878 in France, inspired by the British Telegraph Act 1869 which paved the way for the nationalisation of telegraph companies and their operations, the cost of telegraphy remained high.

In the United States, the judgment in Inter Ocean Publishing v. Associated Press facilitated competition by requiring agencies to accept all newspapers wishing to join. As a result of the increasing newspapers, the Associated Press was now challenged by the creation of United Press Associations in 1907 and International News Service by newspaper publisher William Randolph Hearst in 1909.

Driven by the huge U.S. domestic market, boosted by the runaway success of radio, all three major agencies required the dismantling of the "cartel agencies" through the Agreement of 26 August 1927. They were concerned about the success of U.S. agencies from other European countries which sought to create national agencies after the First World War. Reuters had been weakened by war censorship, which promoted the creation of newspaper cooperatives in the Commonwealth and national agencies in Asia, two of its strong areas.

After the Second World War, the movement for the creation of national agencies accelerated, when accessing the independence of former colonies, the national agencies were operated by the state. Reuters, became cooperative, managed a breakthrough in finance, and helped to reduce the number of U.S. agencies from three to one, along with the internationalization of the Spanish EFE and the globalization of Agence France-Presse.

In 1924, Benito Mussolini placed Agenzia Stefani under the direction of Manlio Morgagni, who expanded the agency's reach significantly both within Italy and abroad. Agenzia Stefani was dissolved in 1945, and its technical structure and organization were transferred to the new Agenzia Nazionale Stampa Associata (ANSA). Wolffs was taken over by the Nazi regime in 1934. The German Press Agency (dpa) in Germany was founded as a co-operative in Goslar on 18 August 1949 and became a limited liability company in 1951. Fritz Sänger was the first editor-in-chief. He served as managing director until 1955 and as managing editor until 1959. The first transmission occurred at 6 a.m. on 1 September 1949.

Since the 1960s, the major agencies were provided with new opportunities in television and magazine, and news agencies delivered specialized production of images and photos, the demand for which is constantly increasing. In France, for example, they account for over two-thirds of national market.

== Big Three agencies ==
Three international news agencies are commonly referred to as the "Big Three" because of their historical prominence, global reach, and central role in the international news ecosystem: Associated Press (AP), Reuters, and Agence France-Presse (AFP). All three trace their origins to the mid-19th century and continue to operate extensive worldwide news-gathering networks. Until the 1980s, this group was often expanded to include United Press International (UPI), forming what was commonly described as a "Big Four". At that time, these four agencies were estimated to provide more than 90% of the foreign news published by newspapers worldwide.

Together, AP, Reuters, and AFP form the core of the international wholesale news market. They primarily focus on public affairs, politics, and business, while also covering selected areas of sports and entertainment. Their reporting generally follows a neutral editorial style and employs a standardized and non-interpretive approach to news writing, emphasizing key factual elements at the beginning of news stories, followed by supporting details and background information.

Beyond the Big Three, two other international news agencies have emerged as leading global actors. Bloomberg News, founded in New York in 1990, specializes in financial and business reporting and maintains a global network of correspondents concentrated in major financial centers. Xinhua News Agency, a state-owned agency based in China and founded in 1931, has experienced significant expansion in recent decades and now rivals other major international agencies in terms of size, scope, and global reach.

== Organizational models ==
=== Commercial services ===
News agencies can be corporations that sell news (e.g., PA Media, Thomson Reuters, dpa and United Press International). Commercial newswire services charge businesses to distribute their news (e.g., Business Wire, GlobeNewswire, PR Newswire, PR Web, and Cision).

The major news agencies generally prepare hard news stories and feature articles that can be used by other news organizations with little or no modification, and then sell them to other news organizations. They provide these articles in bulk electronically through wire services (originally they used telegraphy; today they frequently use the Internet). Corporations, individuals, analysts, and intelligence agencies may also subscribe.

Other agencies work cooperatively with large media companies, generating their news centrally and sharing local news stories the major news agencies may choose to pick up and redistribute (e.g., Associated Press (AP), Agence France-Presse (AFP) or the Indian news agency PTI).

=== Government funded ===
Governments may also control news agencies: China (Xinhua), Russia (TASS), and several other countries have government-funded news agencies which also use information from other agencies as well.

=== Alternative news agencies ===
News sources, collectively, described as alternative media provide reporting that emphasizes a self-defined "non-corporate view" as a contrast to the points of view expressed in corporate media and government-generated news releases. Internet-based alternative news agencies form one component of these sources.

== Associations ==
There are several different associations of news agencies. EANA is the European Alliance of Press Agencies, while the OANA is an association of news agencies of the Asia-Pacific region. MINDS is a global network of leading news agencies collaborating in new media business.

== List of major news agencies ==
| Name | Abbrev. | Country |
|---|---|---|
| Adnkronos | | Italy |
| Agence France-Presse | AFP | France |
| Agência Brasil | ABR | Brazil |
| Agencia EFE | EFE | Spain |
| Agenția de Presă RADOR (National Radio) | Rador | Romania |
| Agenția Română de Presă | AGERPRES | Romania |
| Agenzia Giornalistica Italia | AGI | Italy |
| Agenzia Nazionale Stampa Associata | ANSA | Italy |
| AKIpress News Agency | | Kyrgyzstan |
| Algemeen Nederlands Persbureau | ANP | Netherlands |
| Algeria Press Service | APS | Algeria |
| Anadolu Agency | AA | Turkey |
| Andina | | Peru |
| Antara | | Indonesia |
| Armenpress | | Armenia |
| Asian News International | ANI | India |
| Associated Press | AP | United States |
| Associated Press of Pakistan | APP | Pakistan |
| Athens-Macedonian News Agency | AMNA | Greece |
| Australian Associated Press | AAP | Australia |
| Austria Presse Agentur | APA | Austria |
| Azerbaijan State Telegraph Agency | AzerTAc | Azerbaijan |
| Bahrain News Agency | BNA | Bahrain |
| Bakhtar News Agency | | Afghanistan |
| Baltic News Service | BNS | Estonia |
| Bangladesh Sangbad Shangstha | BSS | Bangladesh |
| Belga | BELGA | Belgium |
| Beta News Agency | | Serbia |
| Bloomberg News | | United States |
| BNO News | | Netherlands |
| Bulgarian Telegraph Agency | BTA | Bulgaria |
| The Canadian Press | CP | Canada |
| Caribbean Media Corporation | CMC | Barbados |
| CCTV+ | | China |
| Central News Agency | CNA | Taiwan |
| China News Service | CNS | China |
| Croatian News Agency | HINA | Croatia |
| Czech News Agency | ČTK | Czech Republic |
| Demirören News Agency | DHA | Turkey |
| Deutsche Presse-Agentur | DPA | Germany |
| Dow Jones Newswires | | United States |
| Emirates News Agency | WAM | United Arab Emirates |
| European Pressphoto Agency | EPA | Europe |
| Fars News Agency | FNA | Iran |
| Islamic Consultative Assembly News Agency | ICANA | Iran |
| İhlas News Agency | IHA | Turkey |
| Islamic Republic News Agency | IRNA | Iran |
| Iranian Students' News Agency | ISNA | Iran |
| Indo-Asian News Service | IANS | India |
| Interfax | | Russia |
| Inter Press Service | IPS | Italy |
| Jewish Telegraphic Agency | JTA | United States |
| Jiji Press | | Japan |
| Kenya News Agency | KNA | Kenya |
| Korean Central News Agency | KCNA | North Korea |
| Kyodo News | | Japan |
| Lankapuvath | | Sri Lanka |
| Lao News Agency | KPL | Laos |
| Lusa News Agency | LUSA | Portugal |
| Maghreb Arabe Presse | MAP | Morocco |
| Magyar Távirati Iroda | MTI | Hungary |
| Malaysian National News Agency | BERNAMA | Malaysia |
| Namibia Press Agency | NAMPA | Namibia |
| Iraqi News Agency | INA | Iraq |
| New Zealand Press Association | NZPA | New Zealand |
| News Agency of Nigeria | NAN | Nigeria |
| Norsk Telegrambyrå | NTB | Norway |
| Pacnews | | New Zealand |
| Pakistan Press International | PPI | Pakistan |
| PanARMENIAN.Net | PAN | Armenia |
| Philippine News Agency | PNA | Philippines |
| Polska Agencja Prasowa | PAP | Poland |
| PA Media | PA | United Kingdom |
| Pressclub Information Agency | PIA | Bulgaria |
| Press Trust of India | PTI | India |
| Qatar News Agency | QNA | Qatar |
| Reuters | | United Kingdom |
| Ritzaus Bureau | Ritzau | Denmark |
| Rossiya Segodnya | | Russia |
| Ruptly | | Russia |
| Russian News Agency TASS | TASS | Russia |
| Saba News Agency or Yemen News Agency | SABA | Yemen |
| Saudi Press Agency | SPA | Saudi Arabia |
| Schweizerische Depeschenagentur | SDA | Switzerland |
| Slovenian Press Agency | STA | Slovenia |
| Suomen Tietotoimisto | STT | Finland |
| Syrian Arab News Agency | SANA | Syria |
| Tahitipresse | ATP | French Polynesia |
| Tanjug Tačno | | Serbia |
| Telenoticiosa Americana | TELAM | Argentina |
| Tidningarnas Telegrambyrå | TT | Sweden |
| Turkmenistan State News Agency | TDH | Turkmenistan |
| United News of India | UNI | India |
| United News of Bangladesh | UNB | Bangladesh |
| United Press International | UPI | United States |
| World Entertainment News Network | WENN | United Kingdom |
| Vietnam News Agency | VNA | Vietnam |
| Via News Agency | VIANEWS | Portugal |
| Xinhua News Agency | XINHUA | China |
| Yonhap News Agency | YONHAP | South Korea |
| ZUMA Press | | United States |

== List of commercial press release agencies ==
- Asian News International
- Business Wire
- Cision
- CNW Group
- GlobeNewswire
- Korea Newswire
- PR Newswire
- PR Web
- Press Trust of India

== See also ==
- List of news agencies
- News embargo
- Press release distribution
