= Hindusthan Samachar =

Indian news agency

- Type: Multi Lingual News Agency
- Industry: News media
- Founded: 1948
- Founder: S. S. Apte
- Headquarters: Hindusthan Samachar Cooperative Society Limited Plot No. 12, Block No. 80, First Floor,Prop. No. 23, Panchkuian Road, R.K. Ashram Metro Station, Pillar No. 12 New Delhi – 110001, India
- Key people: Arvind Bhalchandra Mardikar - Chairman
- Website: https://hindusthansamachar.in/

Hindusthan Samachar is the first multilingual news agency in India, subscribed by more than 200 newspapers and almost all the news channels including Doordarshan (DD).

== History ==
Hindusthan Samachar was founded in 1948 by S. S. Apte, offering its services in 15 languages: Bengali, Odia, Assamese, Telugu, Malayalam, Urdu, Punjabi, Gujarati, Hindi, Marathi, Sanskrit and Tamil. In 1951, the Government of Bihar subscribed to Hindusthan Samachar, followed by many states in India. All India Radio and Radio Nepal were once subscribers. It was registered as a cooperative society in 1956.

A year after a state of emergency was declared in India in 1975, Hindusthan Samachar was merged with Press Trust of India, United News of India and Samachar Bharati to form the media monopoly Samachar.

Hindusthan Samachar was relaunched by Shrikant Joshi after 1999.

== Present ==
At present, Hindusthan Samachar has 22 news bureaus and 600 correspondents spread across the country. It offers its services in 12 languages.

== Bibliography ==
1. Shrivastava, K. M. (2007). News Agencies from Pigeon to Internet. Sterling Publishers Pvt. Ltd. ISBN 9781932705676.
2. Mehta, D. S. (1979). Mass Communication and Journalism in India. Allied Publishers. ISBN 9788170233534.
3. Kumar, Keval J. (2000). Mass Communication in India. Jaico Publishing House. ISBN 9788172243739.
4. Aggarwal, S. K. (1989). Media Credibility. Mittal Publications. ISBN 9788170991571.
5. Kanung, Chitra (2001). Freedom Under Assault. A.P.H. Publishing Corporation. p. 114. ISBN 9788176482264.
6. Jones, Derek, ed. (2015). Censorship: A World Encyclopedia. Routledge. ISBN 9781136798634.
7. Sharma, Diwakar (2004). Mass Communication: Theory and Practice in the 21st Century. Deep and Deep Publications. ISBN 9788176295079.
