= Emirates News Agency =

State news agency of the United Arab Emirates

- وكالة أنباء الإمارات وام

Agency overview
- Formed: November 1976 (established); 18 June 1977 (began operations)
- Jurisdiction: Government of the United Arab Emirates
- Headquarters: Abu Dhabi
- Website: WAM

Emirates News Agency (Arabic: وكالة أنباء الإمارات, romanized: Wakalat Anba'a al Emarat), also known as WAM (Arabic: وام), is the official news agency of the United Arab Emirates.

== History and profile ==
The WAM was established in November 1976. It started an Arabic service on 18 June 1977, and an English service was established by Peter Hellyer in December 1978.

It is headquartered in Abu Dhabi and and, since 2025, has operated under the National Media Authority (NMA), a federal body established by Federal Decree-Law No. 11 of 2025 that consolidated the UAE Media Council, the National Media Office and the Emirates News Agency.

The agency operates through a network of foreign correspondents around the world. It is a member of the Gulf Cooperation Council news agencies, the Federation of Arab News Agencies (FANA), the International Islamic News Agency, the Non-Aligned News Agencies Pool and of the Organization of Asia-Pacific News Agencies (OANA).

The agency has cooperation and news exchange agreements with various news agencies, including the Sudan News Agency, Bernama (Malaysia), Xinhua (China), the Kuwait News Agency (KUNA), Petra (Jordan), the Indonesian News Agency, and the Saba News Agency (Yemen). Since 2012, the agency has also been in cooperation with Anadolu Agency (Turkey). WAM launched a Hebrew language service in April 2021. WAM provides multimedia news services—including text reports, photographs, video, infographics and documentaries—and distributes its content in multiple languages, covering the country's political, economic and developmental activities.

== Services and products ==
WAM provides multimedia news services spanning text, photographs, video, infographics and documentaries, alongside comprehensive coverage of the UAE's political, economic and development activities, and distributes its output in several languages to audiences across different continents.
