= Organization of Asia-Pacific News Agencies =

Asia-Pacific region news agency umbrella organization

The Organization of Asia-Pacific News Agencies (OANA) is an association of news agencies from UNESCO (United Nations Educational, Scientific and Cultural Organization) member states in the Asia-Pacific region. It was previously known as the Organization of Asian News Agencies.

It was formed in 1961 on UNESCO's initiative. It provides a news wire service containing articles donated by its members.

== Members ==
The following agencies are members of OANA.

Country	Name
Afghanistan	Bakhtar News Agency
Australia	Australian Associated Press
Azerbaijan	Azerbaijan State Telegraph Agency
Azerbaijan	Trend News Agency
Bahrain	Bahrain News Agency
Bangladesh	Bangladesh Sangbad Sangstha
Bangladesh	United News of Bangladesh
China	Xinhua News Agency
India	Press Trust of India
India	Asian News International
Indonesia	Antara
Iran	Islamic Republic News Agency
Iran	Mosbatemardom
Iran	Mehr News Agency
Iran	Fars News Agency
Iraq	National Iraqi News Agency
Japan	Jiji Press
Japan	Kyodo News
Kazakhstan	Kazinform
Kuwait	Kuwait News Agency
Kyrgyzstan	Kabar
Laos	Lao News Agency
Malaysia	Bernama
Mongolia	Montsame News Agency
Nepal	Rastriya Samachar Samati
North Korea	Korean Central News Agency
Oman	Oman News Agency
Pakistan	Pakistan Press International
Pakistan	Associated Press of Pakistan
Philippines	Philippine News Agency
Qatar	Qatar News Agency
Russia	ITAR-TASS News Agency
Russia	Russian Information Agency
Saudi Arabia	Saudi Press Agency
South Korea	Yonhap News Agency
Sri Lanka	Lankapuvath
Syria	Syrian Arab News Agency
Thailand	Thai News Agency
Turkey	Anadolu Agency
United Arab Emirates	Emirates News Agency
Vietnam	Vietnam News Agency
Yemen	Saba News Agency

== See also ==
- Asia-Pacific
- Journalism
