= Iraqi News Agency =

Arabic news agency

Iraqi News Agency (INA)
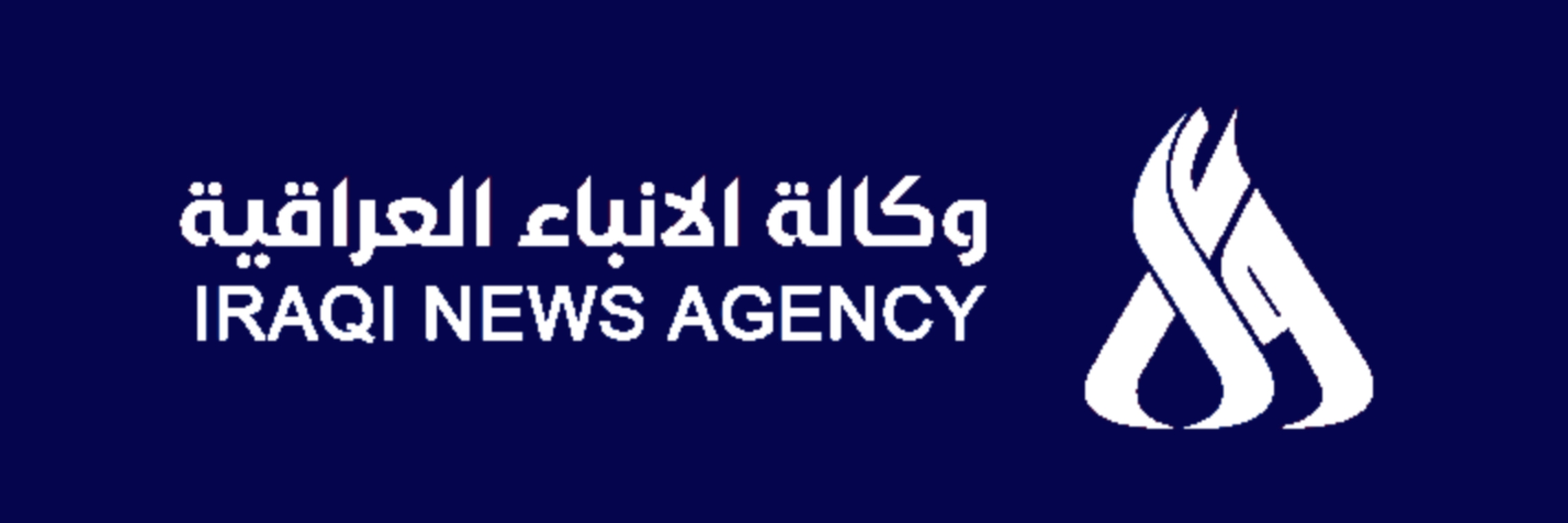

Agency overview
- Formed: 1959
- Headquarters: Baghdad
- Website: ina.iq/en/

The Iraqi News Agency (INA), (Arabic: وكالة الأنباء العراقية (واع)) is an Iraqi Baghdad-based public service broadcaster established in March 1959. It is the second oldest news agency among Arab countries after the Middle East News Agency in Egypt, which was established in 1955.

The Iraqi News Agency (INA) at one point employed 320 editorial, technical and administrative staff and had 48 offices and correspondents in Arab and foreign countries. This number was reduced to 15 since sanctions were imposed on Iraq in August 1990. In April 1999 the Iraqi News Agency (INA) launched an Arabic and English site. And leading world news agencies such as AFP, dpa and EFE were subscribed to INA.

== History ==
=== During Saddam's reign ===
During the Iran–Iraq War correspondents had "been tightly restricted on their movements, and had been provided with little more opportunities than to glean official statements and communiques, interview Western diplomats, who themselves were often isolated from official sources, and monitor radio reports and dispatches of the official Iraqi News Agency".

The government desired to have a single official source to promote important and sensitive news in a way that supported the government. "INA transmitted bulletins in Arabic and English 14 hours a day and is virtually the only source of news for the media. As with other media content, the news gathered and disseminated by INA is mobilized as propaganda supporting Iraqi political leadership. The Iraqi News Agency also functioned as an important source of policy guidance. It not only conveys news of the regime's activities but also provides occasional commentaries or backgrounds which contain the regime's interpretation of events". As a whole, the Iraqi News Agency (INA) functioned as a propaganda tool for Saddam's government during his time.

=== After the fall of Saddam ===
After the fall of Saddam, other news agencies were formed in Iraq, including the National Iraqi News Agency. But since 2017, Iraqi News Agency (INA), which was closed for several years after the fall of Saddam Hussein in 2003, has been revived and introduced as the state run news agency of Iraq.

== FANA membership ==
INA played a significant role in establishing the Federation of Arab News Agencies and is Iraq's official representative in the Federation.

== INA abbreviation ==
At the time of its establishment the Iraqi news agency’s English abbreviation INA was also used for a media organization called Arab News Agency, which was owned by Reuters. Between 1959 and 1963, there were talks between Iraqi news agency and Reuters, which finally led to the transfer of this name to Iraqi news agency, and since then INA is used as the abbreviation of Iraqi News Agency.

== See also ==
- Federation of Arab News Agencies (FANA)
- Mass media in Iraq
