= Assaf Abu Rahhal =

Lebanese journalist

- Born: 18 December 1955; Kfeir, Lebanon
- Died: 3 August 2010 (aged 54); Adaisseh, Lebanon
- Cause of death: Military fire
- Resting place: Kfeir, Lebanon
- Occupation: Journalist
- Employer: Al-Akhbar

Assaf Abu Rahhal (Arabic: عساف أبو رحال; 18 December 1955 – 3 August 2010) was a veteran Lebanese journalist who was killed by the Israel Defense Forces during the 2010 Israel–Lebanon border clash, in which an Israeli reserve lieutenant colonel was killed and a captain was shot and injured by Lebanese sniper fire.

According to Reporters Without Borders, Abu Rahhal was the first Lebanese journalist killed since 2006 when Lebanese and Israeli forces clashed. He was one of five people to die in the incident, which received international attention and scrutiny, but he was the only journalist killed.

== Personal ==
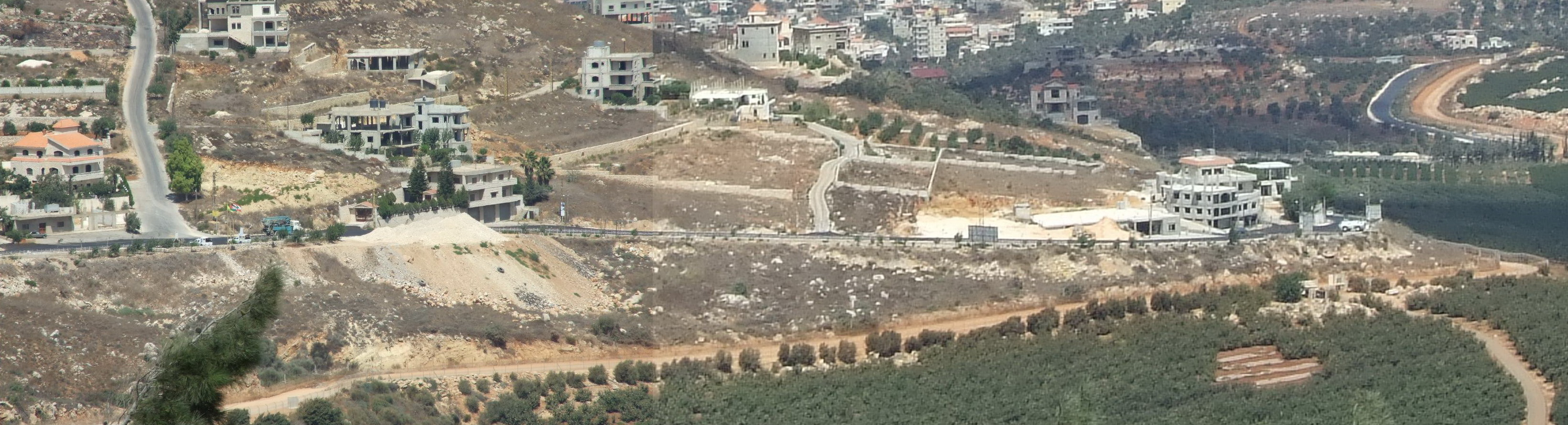
The Lebanese border-area village of Odaisseh, as seen from Misgav Am, Israel.

Assaf Abu Rahhal was a native of Kfeir, Hasbaya District, Lebanon. He was married and a father of three. He died in Odaisseh, Lebanon, while reporting for his newspaper, as a result of Israeli military fire. Final services were held at Saint George Roman Orthodox Church in Kfeir for the deceased. The village of Odaisseh commemorated Abu Rahhal's death on the second anniversary of his death.

== Career ==
Abu Rahhal worked for the Al Akhbar daily newspaper for four years where he was covering southern Lebanon. Before that he was a journalist with Al-Mustaqbal, an Arabic daily newspaper, and he sometimes wrote for Shu’un Janoubiah magazine.

== Death in border incident ==
Mentioned locations within Lebanon relative to Beirut.

The dispute began around noon on 3 August 2010 when Israeli forces began to dig up a tree at the border between Misgav Am, Israel and Odaisseh, Lebanon. The United Nations Interim Force in Lebanon had given the Israelis permission to do the maintenance. The Lebanese claimed the Israelis had crossed border in conducting this work. The Israelis disputed this claim, and the UN Peacekeeping force also dismissed the border crossing claim. Lebanese sniper fire ensued. Both sides agree that the Lebanese issued a verbal warning prior to the shooting and the Israelis stood their ground and claimed they were on Israeli territory. After an Israeli reserve lieutenant colonel was killed and a captain was shot and injured, the Israelis responded to the sniper fire from the Lebanese side of the border. UN forces intervened to bring a halt to the armed conflict. Reporters Without Borders said the Israelis wanted to install a surveillance camera on the site of the tree. This was the first armed incident since 2006 Lebanon War and a violation of the UN Resolution 1701 to prevent further conflict.

In all, one Israeli officer, three Lebanese soldiers and Lebanese journalist Abu Rahhal were killed in the incident. In addition one Israeli officer was wounded and on the Lebanese side four soldiers were wounded and Lebanese TV reporter Shoaib.

== Reactions ==
The killing of Abu Rahhal was condemned by Irina Bokova, who is the director-general of UNESCO: "I am deeply concerned about the circumstances in which Assaf Abu Rahhal was killed and his colleague Ali Shoaib injured ... I would further underline that freedom of expression, a fundamental human right, implies the possibility of exercising this right in safety. Armed forces are obligated to respect it."

Lebanon's Syndicate of Photographers and the Maharat Foundation condemned the attack. The French-based Reporters Without Borders said Abu Rahhal's death was due to an "Israeli military blunder."

Al-Akhbar editor Omar Nashabe said, "It is totally unacceptable that a civilian, a dedicated journalist, husband and father, be targeted and killed while the international community and UN troops [in southern Lebanon] stand by idly." News reports contradict the charge that Abu Rahhal was targeted.

== Other journalists killed on the border ==
According to the New York-based Committee to Protect Journalists, the following Lebanese and Israeli journalists have died along the Israeli-Lebanese border in addition to Assaf Abu Rahhal: Ahmed Haidar of Al-Manar died in 1993; Ilan Roeh of Israeli radio died in 1999. Layal Najib, a freelance photographer, died in the border dispute in 2006. She was the last journalist to have been killed before Abu Rahhal.

The shooting of Lebanese TV journalist Ali Shabaan by Syrian forces on the Lebanese-Syrian border 9 April 2012 stirred up memories of Abu Rahhal at Al-Akhbar. Shabaan was the next journalist after Abu Rahhal to have been killed near the Lebanese border.
