= Lamia Louali =

Algerian karateka

- Born: February 20, 1977 (age 49); Algiers, Algeria
- Nationality: Algerian
- Style: Koshiki karate

Lamia Louali (born 20 February 1977) is an Algerian karateka who competes in Koshiki karate.

== Career ==
Louali won the Koshiki karate World Championship three times, in 2000, 2002 and 2004.

She was named Algeria's Athlete of the Year by the Algeria Press Service in 2003 and again in 2004.

During the award ceremony on 26 January 2005, she announced her retirement from competitive sport.
