= Issa J. Boullata =

Palestinian scholar and writer (1929–2019)

- عيسى بُلاطه
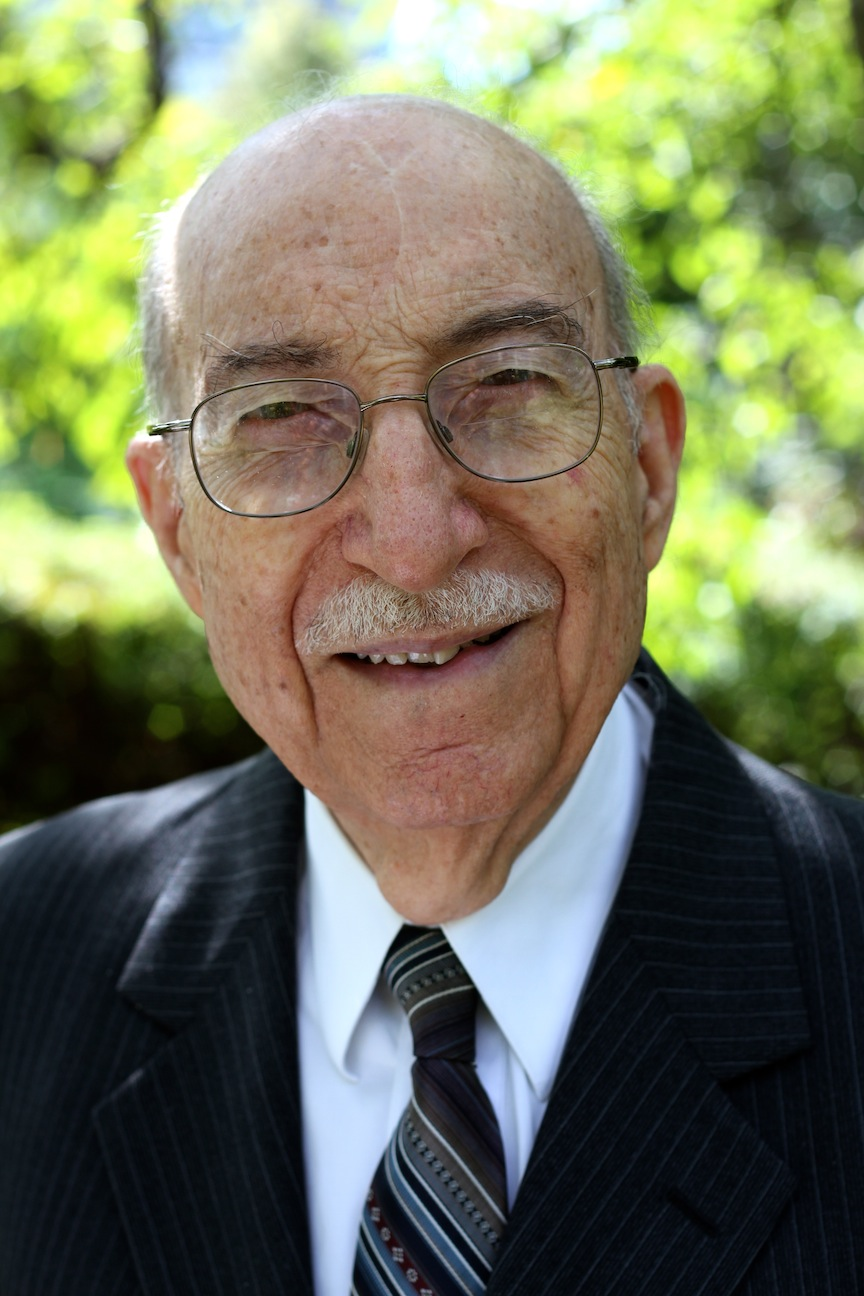
- Issa J. Boullata, September 2012, Montreal
- Born: February 25, 1929; Jerusalem, Mandatory Palestine
- Died: May 1, 2019 (aged 90); Montreal, Quebec, Canada
- Citizenship: United States, Canada.
- Occupations: Scholar, writer, translator

Issa J. Boullata (Arabic: عيسى بُلاطه; February 25, 1929 – May 1, 2019) was a Palestinian scholar, writer, and translator of Arabic literature.

== Biography ==
He was born in Jerusalem on February 25, 1929 during the British Mandate of Palestine. He obtained a First Class BA (Honours) in Arabic and Islamic studies in 1964 followed by a PhD in Arabic literature in 1969, both from the University of London. He taught Arabic studies for seven years at Hartford Seminary, Connecticut, before moving to McGill University, Montreal, in 1975. He taught graduate courses in Arabic Literature, Modern Arab Thought, and Qur'anic Studies at McGill's Institute of Islamic Studies until his retirement in 2004, and the honorific title of Emeritus Professor was conferred upon him on September 1, 2009.

Boullata was the author of books on Arabic literature and poetry, and on the Qur'an. He also wrote articles and book reviews for scholarly journals, as well as articles for encyclopedias. He was a translator of Arabic literature and a two-time winner of the Arkansas Arabic Translation Award. He was a contributing editor of Banipal magazine of London, and his literary translations have appeared in issues of the magazine.

Boullata served as consultant for "The Blue Metropolis Al-Majidi Ibn Dhaher Arab Literary Prize" offered by the Blue Metropolis Foundation at its annual international literary festival in Montreal. Named after the poet Al-Majidi Ibn Dhaher, the prize, worth CAD $5,000, was initiated in 2007 by his efforts with donors. The prize was sponsored by the Abu Dhabi Authority for Culture and Heritage, and was given yearly to a creative Arab writer at the recommendation of a jury composed of an international roster of poets, novelists and literary professionals. The prize is currently on hiatus.

Marita Seward, of Oneonta, New York, was Boullata's wife for 56 years. She died on 15 August 2016. The couple had one daughter and three sons, including David Boullata, a broadcaster (pseudonym: David Tyler) in Montreal, communications lecturer, and writer. Kamal Boullata, a painter, art historian, and literary writer, is Issa Boullata's brother and lives in Berlin, Germany.

== Books ==
=== As author ===
- Outlines of Romanticism in Modern Arabic Poetry (1960), new edition (2014) (in Arabic الرومانسية ومعالمها في الشعر العربي الحديث)
- Badr Shakir al-Sayyab: His Life and Poetry (1971; 6th ed. 2007) (in Arabic بدر شاكر السياب : حياته وشعره)
- Modern Arab Poets, 1950–1975 (1976) (an anthology in English translation)
- Trends and Issues in Contemporary Arab Thought (1990)
- A Window on Modernism: Studies in the Works of Jabra Ibrahim Jabra (2002) (in Arabic نافذة على الحداثة: دراسات في أدب جبرا إبراهيم جبرا )
- Homecoming to Jerusalem (1998) (a novel in Arabic عائد إلى القدس)
- A Retired Gentleman and Other Stories (2007) (a short-story collection in English); republished as True Arab Love and Other Short Stories (2016); translated into French as Amours Arabes (2016)
- Rocks and a Wisp of Soil (2005) (in Arabic صخر وحفنة من تراب : مقالات في النقد الأدبي ),(essays in literary criticism)
- The Bells of Memory: A Palestinian Boyhood in Jerusalem (2014)( a memoir, covering years from 1929 to 1948); translated into French as Les Échos de la Mémoire: Une Enfance Palestinienne à Jérusalem(2014).

=== As editor ===
- Critical Perspectives on Modern Arabic Literature (1980)
- Tradition and Modernity in Arabic Literature (1997, with Terri DeYoung)
- Literary Structures of Religious Meaning in the Qur'an (2000)
- The Miraculous Inimitability of the Holy Qur'an throughout History (2006) (in Arabic إعجاز القرآن الكريم عـبر التاريخ)

=== As translator ===
- Embers and Ashes: Memoirs of an Arab Intellectual by Hisham Sharabi
- Flight Against Time a novel by Emily Nasrallah
- Fugitive Light a novel by Mohammed Berrada
- My Life an autobiography by Ahmad Amin
- Princesses' Street: Baghdad Memories an autobiography by Jabra Ibrahim Jabra
- The First Well: A Bethlehem Boyhood an autobiography by Jabra Ibrahim Jabra (winner of the 1993 University of Arkansas Press Award for Translation from Arabic)
- The Game of Forgetting a novel by Mohammed Berrada
- The Square Moon short stories by Ghada Samman (winner of the 1997 University of Arkansas Press Award)
- The Unique Necklace a compendium of Arabic classics (Garnet Publishing, UK, vols. 1,2,3—2006, 2009, 2011) by 10th-century Andalusian writer Ibn Abd Rabbih
- The Caliph's Sister, a novel by Jurji Zaidan
- Three Treatises on the I`jaz of the Qur'an, Qur'anic & literary studies by al-Rummani, al-Khattabi, & `Abd al-Qahir al-Jurjani.
- Numerous poems published in Salma Khadra Jayyusi's Modern Arabic Poetry: An Anthology (1987) and Anthology of Modern Palestinian Literature (1992), and poems and prose pieces in Banipal and elsewhere.

=== As translator from English to Arabic ===
- Wallace Stevens by William York Tindall, 1962
- Edith Wharton by Louis Auchincloss, 1962

== See also ==
- List of Arabic-English translators

=== As journal editor ===
- The Muslim World (1970–1980) with Willem Bijlefeld.
- Al-'Arabiyya, Journal of the American Association of Teachers of Arabic (1977–1982)

=== Festschrifts ===
Two Festschrifts were published to honor Boullata:

- Tradition, Modernity, and Postmodernity in Arabic Literature : Essays in Honor of Professor Issa J. Boullata, edited by Kamal Abdel-Malek and Wael Hallaq (Leiden: E.J. Brill, 2000)
- Coming to Terms with the Qur’an: A Volume in Honor of Professor Issa Boullata, McGill University, edited by Khaleel Mohammed and Andrew Rippin (North Haledon, NJ: Islamic Publications International, 2008).

=== Awards ===
Issa J. Boullata was awarded the MESA Mentoring Award in Nov. 2004 by the Middle East Studies Association of North America in recognition of his excellent teaching and scholarly influence on generations of students.

=== As PhD and MA supervisor ===
Professor Boullata supervised 10 PhD dissertations and 38 MA theses in his higher education career in USA and Canada between 1968 and 2004, and some of them have been published and their authors now occupy respected positions in academic and government institutions.

=== As Arabic programming consultant ===
Since 2006, Boullata has been the Arabic programming consultant to Montreal's annual Blue Metropolis International Literary Festival and helped it establish a yearly prize for an Arab author, sponsored by the Abu Dhabi Authority for Culture and Heritage and called Blue Metropolis Al-Majidi Ibn Dhaher Arab Prize. The prize is currently on hiatus.
