= Nasr Taha Mustafa =

Yemeni journalist and politician

Nasr Taha Mustafa (Arabic: نصر طه مصطفى, born 29 November 1962) is a Yemeni journalist and politician. He is currently the President's Advisor for Media and Cultural Affairs. He quit his position as Head of the State News Agency (Saba) and his position as a ruling party member on 19 March 2011 after the Friday of Dignity massacre committed by the regime then during the 2011 Yemeni uprising.

He served in key government and non-government positions as follows:

#	Position	From	To
1	Minister of Information	Jun 2014	Nov 2014
2	Director of the Presidential Office	2012	2014
3	Chairman of Yemen News Agency (Saba)	2001	2011
4	Head of the Federation of Arab News Agencies (FANA)	2003	2005
5	Chairman of the Yemeni Journalists Syndicate	2006	2009
6	General Manager of Al-Thawra Press and Publications State Corporation	1995	1996

He has published four books:

#	Year	Book	Issuer
1	1994	Attempt to Understand the Yemeni Crisis	
2	1999	Ali Abdullah Saleh .. Experience and Future Prospects	The Yemeni Center for Strategic Studies (YCSS)
3	2000	Islah Party .. Issues, Stances and Challenges	
4	2004	Concerns of End of Century .. Yemen and Major Political Shifts	Riad El-Rayyes - Beirut
