= Serdar Karagöz =

Turkish journalist (born 1981)

- Born: 24 May 1981 (age 45); Sakarya, Turkey
- Education: Istanbul Bilgi University (BA Political Science; MA Human Rights Law); The New School (MA Media Studies)
- Occupations: Journalist, media executive
- Years active: 2008–present
- Employer: Anadolu Ajansı
- Title: President and CEO
- Website: https://www.aa.com.tr/en/p/executive-team

Serdar Karagöz (born 24 May 1981) is a Turkish journalist and media executive, serving as President and CEO of Anadolu Ajansı since 2021.

== Early life and education ==
Serdar Karagöz was born on 24 May 1981 in Sakarya, Turkey. He completed his primary and secondary education in Istanbul before earning a Bachelor’s degree in Political Science and a Master’s degree in Human Rights Law from Istanbul Bilgi University. He later obtained a second Master’s degree in Media Studies from The New School in New York City.

== Career ==
Karagöz began his media career in 2008 at Turkuaz Media Group as a management trainee, rotating through various departments to build editorial and operational expertise. In 2010, he moved to New York City to join the Syndication Department of The New York Times. From 2012 to 2014, he worked as a diplomatic correspondent and contributed columns on U.S. affairs to Sabah. During this period, he also founded usabah.com, a Turkish-language portal covering American news. Upon his return to Turkey, he was appointed Foreign News Editor at Sabah.

In 2014, Karagöz became the founding Editor-in-Chief of Daily Sabah, leading the outlet until 2018. He then served as Editor-in-Chief of TRT International News Channels—overseeing TRT World, TRT Arabic and other services—during which time he expanded programming to include Arabic, German, Russian, and Balkan language services.

Since October 2021, Karagöz has led Turkey’s global news agency, Anadolu Ajansı (AA), as President and CEO. Under his direction, Anadolu’s photos and videos have been used as evidence in South Africa’s genocide case at the International Court of Justice and in filings at the International Criminal Court, and a panel on Anadolu’s Gaza documentary “The Evidence” was held in the British Parliament.

Outside his agency roles, Karagöz was elected Vice President of the Organization of Asia-Pacific News Agencies (OANA) in October 2022, President of the Association of Balkan News Agencies–Southeast Europe in September 2023, and President of the Association of Turkish News Agencies (ATNA) in November 2023. In October 2024, he joined the Board of Directors of the Turkish Basketball Federation.

On 29 November 2023, he received the Climate Leaders Award from Bizim Dünyamız Vakfı for pioneering Anadolu Ajansı’s climate-change coverage and distributing it freely to all media outlets. He was also honored with the Global Media Award by the Global Journalism Council in recognition of Anadolu Ajansı’s role in amplifying the voices of oppressed communities worldwide.
