= Al-Kfeir =

Al-Kfeir الكفير
- Municipality
- Location within Lebanon
- Coordinates: 33°25′46″N 35°44′26″E
- Country: Lebanon
- Governorate: Nabatieh Governorate
- District: Hasbaya District
- Elevation: 900 m (3,000 ft)
- Time zone: UTC+2 (EET)
  - Summer (DST): UTC+3 (EEST)
- Dialing code: +961

Al-Kfeir (Arabic: الكفير, romanized: al-Kfayr) is a municipality nestled 900 m above sea level, in Hasbaiya District (Qada'a), an administrative division of Nabatiyeh Governorate (Mohafazah) along the steep slopes of the top of the Jebel Sheikh in Lebanon.

The village enjoys mild summers of an average temperature of 25°C. However, the winters are much colder and the village receives heavy snow.

== Demographics ==
The inhabitants of Al-Kfeir are predominantly Greek Orthodox and Druze, and they mainly cultivate olives, pines and other fruit trees.

In 2014 Christians made up 50.61% and Druze made up 48.38% of registered voters in Al-Kfeir. 43.09% of the voters were and Greek Orthodox.

== Notable people ==
- Firas Hamdan, one of 12 independent politicians who emerged from a mass anti-government protest movement in 2019. Hamdan was hit in the chest by a lead pellet in 2020 during a demonstration near parliament, days after a deadly explosion struck Beirut's port.
- Emily Nasrallah, Lebanese novelist.
- Fares al-Khoury, Syrian politician.
- Issam Abou Jamra, former Deputy Prime Minister of Lebanon.
- Assaf Abu Rahhal, Lebanese journalist killed in the 2010 Israel–Lebanon border clash

== Sources ==
- St. George's Youth Organization in Kfeir
