= National Iraqi News Agency =

News agency in Iraq

National Iraqi News Agency (NINA) الوكالة الوطنية العراقية للأنباء
- Founded: 2005
- Type: News agency
- Location: Iraq
- Website: NINA (in English)

The National Iraqi News Agency (Arabic: الوكالة الوطنية العراقية للأنباء), or NINA, is the first independent news agency in Iraq after the Iraq War. It is primarily an Internet-based news outlet, although it plans to offer a WiFi platform in the near future. It has 15 editorial and executive staff at its head office in the Sadoun district of Baghdad and correspondents in all 18 Iraqi governorates.

== See also ==
- Alive in Baghdad
- Federation of Arab News Agencies (FANA)
- Nina Iraq
