= Allami =

Allami is a surname. Notable people with the surname include:

- Khyam Allami (born 1981), British musician and musicologist of Iraqi origin
- Moaid Allami, Iraqi journalist
- Suaad Allami, Iraqi women's rights activist

== See also ==
- Fatima El Allami (born 1989), Moroccan tennis player
