= Issam Abu Jamra =

Lebanese politician (born 1937)

Deputy Prime Minister
- In office 11 July 2008 – November 2009
- Prime Minister: Fouad Siniora
- Succeeded by: Elias Murr

Deputy Prime Minister
- In office 22 September 1988 – 13 October 1990
- Prime Minister: Michel Aoun

Personal details
- Born: 6 February 1937 (age 89) Kfeir, Hasbeya, French Lebanon
- Party: Free Patriotic Movement (until 2010)
- Education: Lebanese University

Military service
- Allegiance: Lebanon
- Branch/service: Lebanese Armed Forces
- Years of service: 1956–1990
- Rank: Major General
- Battles/wars: 1958 Lebanon crisis Lebanese Civil War

Issam Abu Jamra (Arabic: عصام أبو جمرا; born 6 February 1937) is a retired Lebanese major general and a politician, who served as deputy prime minister in the cabinets of Michel Aoun and Fouad Siniora. Until 2010 he was part of the Free Patriotic Movement.

== Early life and education ==
Jamra was born in Kfeir, Hasbeya, south Lebanon, into a Greek Orthodox family on 6 February 1937. He attended Lebanese army's military academy and graduated as an artillery officer in 1959. In addition, he obtained a bachelor's degree in law from Lebanese University in 1984.

== Career ==
Abu Jamra began his career in Lebanese army in 1956. After serving in different positions in the army and defense ministry, he was appointed deputy prime minister to the interim military government under Michel Aoun on 22 September 1988 and was in office until 13 October 1990. He also served as minister of telecommunications and minister of economy from 22 April 1988 to 25 November 1989. He replaced Georges Saadeh as telecommunications minister. Jamra was succeeded by Joseph El Hachem in the post. Jamra became major general in 1990.

He was appointed deputy prime minister to the cabinet headed by Prime Minister Fouad Siniora on 11 July 2008. He was part of the oppositional share in the cabinet. He was the Free Patriotic Movement's candidate for Greek Orthodox seat in Beirut's first district in the parliament elections held in June 2009. However, he lost his seat to Nayla Tueni.

=== Free Patriotic Movement and exile ===
Jamra is one of the founders of the Free Patriotic Movement and was a parliament member from the party. In 1990, he was exiled to France with Aoun after the latter headed the interim government. They left Lebanon on 30 August 1990, and went first to Larnaca and then to France. France granted them and their families asylum. They both returned to Lebanon on 7 May 2005 after fifteen years in exile.

Although Jamra was a close aide of Aoun, he left the party in 2010.

== Personal life ==
Jamra's spouse died in France while they were in exile there in the 1990s. He has four sons. One of them, Fadi Jamra, is a politician.
