= Layal Najib =

Lebanese photojournalist (1983–2006)

- Born: 30 August 1983
- Died: 23 July 2006 (aged 22) between Siddikine and Qana, Lebanon
- Cause of death: Combat-related crossfire
- Other names: Nejib, Najeeb, Nagib
- Occupation: Freelance photojournalist
- Years active: 2003–2006
- Employer(s): Al Jaras (magazine) and Agence France-Presse (news agency)

Layal Najib (Arabic: ليال نجيب; 30 August 1983 – 23 July 2006), also romanized Nagib, Nejib or Najeeb, was a Lebanese photojournalist for Agence France Press and Al Jaras and the first journalist killed during the 2006 Lebanon War. She was also among several female journalists who were establishing their reputations as reporters during the war, such as Rima Maktabi and Najwa Qassem. Najib is one of seven journalists to have been killed since the end of civil war in 1990. Najib's death follows behind that of female journalist Atwar Bahjat who was killed while covering the Iraq War.

== Background ==
The 2006 war was a turning point for female reporters' ability to report at the front lines alongside male reporters. The female journalists of this generation had either lived or practiced journalism during the Lebanon Civil War (1975–1990) but news organizations did not provide them with any training. Najib's death and her job as a photojournalist was mentioned alongside the successes of other females such as Maktabi and Qassem, who were TV journalists in front of the camera.

== Early history ==
Layal Najib was from Tripoli, Lebanon. She had been at Al Jaras for three years but a photographer for 1 year and 8 months. Prior to working for Al Jaras, Najib was a local freelance photographer. She also had been a freelance photojournalist for the international news agency Agence France Presse. For Layal Najib and other Lebanese female journalists, the 2006 war was their first opportunity to cover a combat environment.

== Death ==
Qana is located in Lebanon and shown relative to Beirut.

Layal Najib was on her way to Siddikine to interview and photograph the population that was fleeing under Israeli artillery fire. Those who drove the same route at that time described a drive through a bombed out main road, obstacles that blocked the road, and vehicles that were littered the side of the road, and sometimes alternative routes were all that was available. The Israeli Defense Force killed Layal Najib immediately 23 July 2006 when shrapnel from one of its missiles shot through the roof of her taxi while she was being driven between the villages of Siddikine and Qana, which are near Tyre, Lebanon. The driver of the taxi, who said he had driven her from Beirut, survived, and said the Red Cross had taken her corpse to a hospital in Tyre.

== Context ==
The 2006 Lebanon War was a 33-day conflict between Lebanon and Israel that began after Lebanese Shiite group Hezbollah conducted a cross-border raid. The population in southern Lebanon was fleeing cities and villages to avoid bombardments. Tyre's population dwindled down to 20 percent as the majority fled. During the period when Najib was killed, Israeli forces had been "indiscriminately" attacking cars, as reported by those attacked, that were driving along southern Lebanon's roads into order to flee. According to a Washington Post report, Israelis ordered villagers from Tairi to evacuate and then later an Israeli helicopter fired a missile at a white minibus fleeing from there and killed seven out of the 19 passengers. Human Rights Watch claimed ambulances that are not to be targeted during combat were also bombed. Although conservatives called the strike on the ambulances a hoax, HRW confirmed the attack and released a report.

== Impact ==
The International Press Institute conducted interviews among members of the Lebanese media in December 2006 and concluded that they suffered "fear for their personal safety" as a consequence of violence that dates back to assassination of Prime Minister Rafik Hariri on 14 February 2005 and violence against the media that escalated afterwards and culminated in the war. The report describes a destabilized media environment. Media were also targeted by the Israeli forces during the war. The International Federation of Journalists protested after the sixth attack on media. The first media worker killed during the 2006 Lebanon War Suleiman Al Chidiac on 22 July 2006 when Israeli's bombed a Lebanese Broadcasting Corporation transmission facility just north of Beirut. Four years after Najib, Assaf Abu Rahhal was the next Lebanese journalist killed by the Israel Defense Forces along the southern Lebanese-Israeli border.

== Reactions ==
Koïchiro Matsuura, director-general of UNESCO, issued a statement following Al Chidiac's and Najib's death: "In times of violent conflict it is essential for all parties to respect the important role the media play in enabling the public to make informed choices and working towards peace and democracy. Belligerents can not regard media staff and media outlets as military targets. And in times of extreme hardship for the region, with hundreds of civilian deaths, the courage of journalists attempting to keep us informed of events deserves recognition." The International Federation of Journalists (IFJ) wrote a letter to the head of the Israeli Defense Force, asking for an investigation into the cases of the attacks on journalists. IFJ General Secretary Aidan White said, "It is imperative that we have answers about these incidents otherwise speculation about targeting media will persist. The Israeli authorities must make it clear to military commanders that unarmed journalists and media are non-combats. They must not come under fire." The statement drew a sharp response for the national affiliate of the IFJ in Israel when the leader of the National Federation of Israeli Journalists "suspended" the relationship and said the IFJ was biased against Israel. The international organization continued to press Israel about the six attacks, including two deaths, it had counted against media. Reporters Without Borders said, "We are appalled that the Israeli army is taking so few precautions to avoid civilian deaths or casualties, especially among the media. We demand that the Israel government investigate the shooting that killed Nagib. We will not be satisfied by the army's standard response that the targets were military ones like to Hezbollah."

Joel Simon, executive director of the Committee to Protect Journalists, said: "We are gravely concerned by the killings of our colleagues Layal Najib and Suleiman al-Chidiac. The aerial bombardment of Lebanon by Israel has caused tremendous hardships to civilians, including journalists who are covering the humanitarian crisis. We are alarmed by the air attacks on television transmission and telecommunication facilities. These strikes have already cost the life of one television technician and wounded another. We have seen no evidence that these media outlets are serving any military function and therefore call on Israel to cease targeting media facilities in Lebanon immediately."

== Awards ==
- The Federation of Arab News Agencies (FANA) awarded Layal Najib best photo in 2006.

== See also ==
- Timeline of military operations in the 2006 Lebanon War
