= Bahrain News Agency =

State news agency of Bahrain

Bahrain News Agency (BNA)
- وكالة أنباء البحرين - بنا

Agency overview
- Formed: 1976; 50 years ago
- Preceding agency: Gulf News Agency
- Jurisdiction: Government of Bahrain
- Headquarters: Manama
- Minister responsible: Ali bin Mohamed Alrumaihi, Minister of Information Affairs
- Agency executive: Abdullah Khalil Buhiji, Director-General
- Parent agency: Ministry of Information Affairs
- Website: www.bna.bh

The Bahrain News Agency (BNA) is the state news agency of the Kingdom of Bahrain. Abdullah Khalil Buhiji is the current director-general of the agency, having been appointed in 2019.

== History and profile ==
The BNA began as the Gulf News Agency (GNA) in 1976 following a meeting by Gulf Information ministers in Riyadh. The GNA's first official broadcast commenced on 1 April 1978, in a ceremony by the Bahraini prime minister Shaikh Khalifa bin Salman Al Khalifa. Tariq Almoayyed served as chairperson of the GNA upon its launch. In 1985, the GNA was integrated into Bahrain's Ministry of Information and would later be renamed to the Bahrain News Agency by a cabinet vote in 2001. The agency is run under the Ministry of Information Affairs. It is a member of the Federation of Arab News Agencies (FANA). The BNA has both Arabic and English publications and is based in Manama. It includes multiple departments such as photography, translation, electronic media, and research amongst others such as its own training centre.

In July 2013, the agency launched BNA Zaman, a service which documents Bahrain's landmark development achievements via pictures.

== Affiliation ==
BNA is an active member of FANA, which includes the national news agencies of 18 Arab countries. The BNA is also a member of the Islamic News Agency network and a member of the executive board of the Organisation of Asian News Agencies. The agency has cooperation agreements with 24 other news groups.

== Recognition ==
The Bahrain News Agency was the recipient of the 2011 Arab Media Outstanding Creativity award by the Arab Organisation for Administrative Development, an affiliated Arab League organisation.

== See also ==
- Federation of Arab News Agencies (FANA)
