= Suaad Allami =

Iraqi women's rights activist

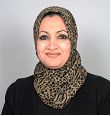
Suaad Allami in 2009

Suaad Allami (Arabic: سعاد اللامي) is a women's rights activist. Her mother encouraged her to have an education, although she herself was illiterate. Allami became a women's rights lawyer. She founded the NGO "Women for Progress" in 2007, and as of 2011 she directs the Women for Progress Center. "Women for Progress" provides many services including legislative advocacy, vocational training, domestic violence counseling, medical exams, literacy education, child care, and exercise opportunities.

Allami also founded the Sadr City Women's Center; she herself was born in Sadr.

She received a 2009 International Women of Courage Award. To celebrate her Global Vital Voices Award win, Suaad agreed to an interview with Nina Iraq magazine, which resulted in a Vital Voice of Leadership story.
