= 2010 Israel–Lebanon border clash =

21st-century armed conflict in the Levant

- Part of Aftermath of the 2006 Lebanon War
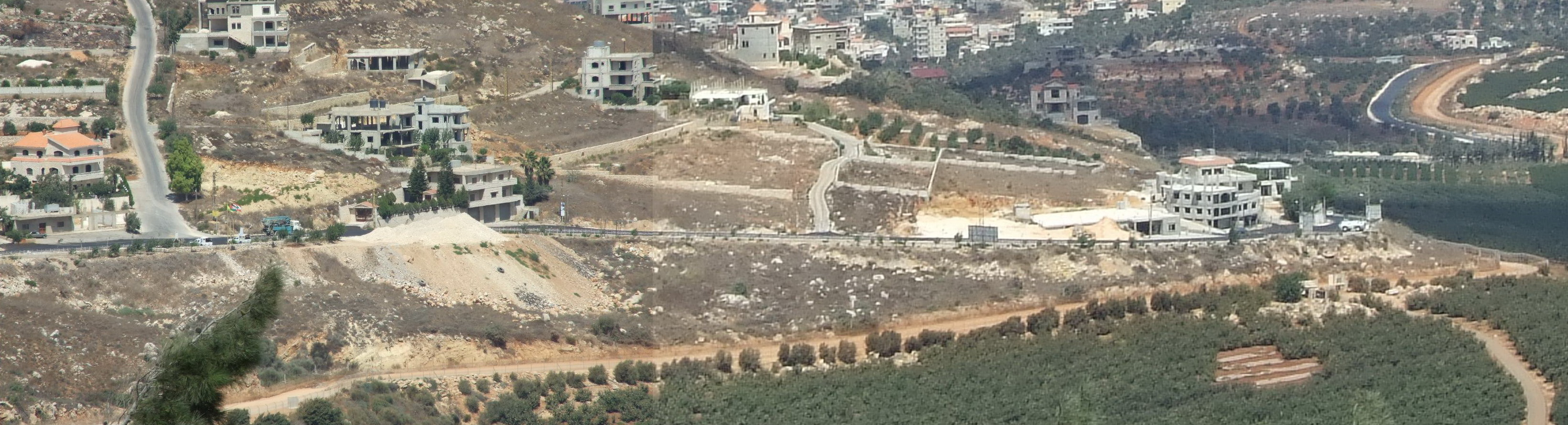
- Village of Odaisseh in Lebanon, as seen from Misgav Am, Israel
Date	August 3, 2010
Location	Israel and Lebanon, near the Israeli community of Misgav Am and the Lebanese villages of Odaisseh and Kfar Kila
Result	Ceasefire: Withdrawal of both armies

Belligerents
Israel	Lebanon

Units involved
Israel Defense Forces	(Lebanon) Lebanese Armed Forces

Strength
(Israel) 10–15 soldiers (Israel) Artillery and attack helicopters	(Lebanon) Unknown

Casualties and losses
(Israel) 1 soldier killed (Israel) 1 soldier wounded	(Lebanon) 2 soldiers killed (Lebanon) 5 soldiers wounded
- 1 Lebanese journalist killed 1 Lebanese journalist wounded

The 2010 Israel–Lebanon border clash occurred on August 3, 2010, between the Lebanese Armed Forces (LAF) and Israel Defense Forces (IDF), after an IDF team attempted to cut down a tree on the Israeli side of the Blue Line, near the Israeli kibbutz of Misgav Am and the Lebanese village of Odaisseh. A high-ranking IDF officer was killed and another wounded when LAF snipers opened fire on an Israeli observation post after receiving authorization from senior Lebanese commanders. IDF soldiers returned fire and responded with artillery shelling and airstrikes on Lebanese positions, killing two Lebanese soldiers and Al Akhbar correspondent Assaf Abu Rahhal, as well as wounding five soldiers and one journalist. This was the most serious escalation on the border since the 2006 Lebanon War.

The Lebanese Army asserted that it opened fire on Israeli soldiers to contravene the attempt of Israelis to intrude through the border of Lebanon in violation of the internationally recognized border between Israel and Lebanon. Israel claimed that it only crossed over a fence on its side of the Blue Line. The United Nations Interim Force in Lebanon (UNIFIL) confirmed Israel's position, adding that Israel had informed them of the border work beforehand. Lebanon's Information Minister later stated that "the Blue Line is not the international border and there are areas south of the Blue Line that are Lebanese territory."

The United States condemned the Lebanese fire on Israeli soldiers as "wholly unjustified and unwarranted", and in response to the incident the United States House of Representatives announced a suspension of aid to the Lebanese Armed Forces. Lebanon responded by saying that it would decline any military assistance from the United States that is conditioned on its agreeing not to use those weapons against Israel.

== Background ==
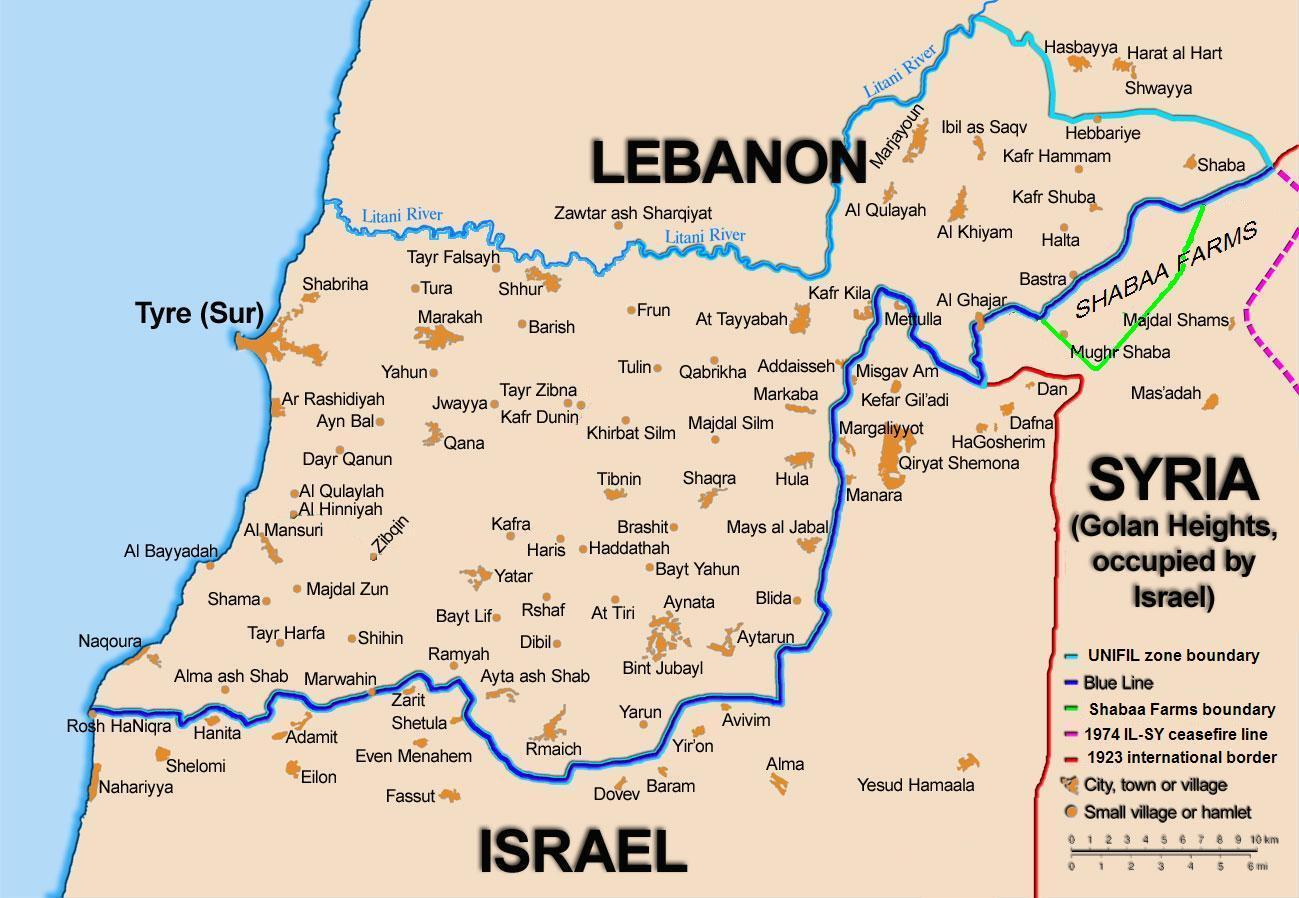
The Blue Line

In the weeks leading up to the incident hostile rhetoric was traded between the Lebanese (particularly Hezbollah) and Israeli sides in light of the reports suggesting the Special Tribunal for Lebanon would indict Hezbollah members. Following an impromptu visit to Lebanon by King Abdullah of Saudi Arabia and Syria's Bashar al-Assad just days before the incident, various media in Lebanon and outside said the likelihood of sparking an outbreak of violence eased. Two days before the incident, however, Assad made a statement marking Syria's Army Day warning that "The spectre of real peace in the region is disappearing, and the possibility of war is increasing." There were conflicting reports as to which side provoked the firefight. The Lebanese Army claimed the conflict began when an Israeli patrol attempted to uproot some trees between the Lebanese villages of Odaisseh and Kfar Kila, while the Israel Defense Forces claimed that Lebanese snipers opened fire on an observation post inside Israel while Israeli troops were carrying out routine maintenance on the Israeli side of the border. UNIFIL confirmed the Israeli claim that the soldiers were inside Israeli territory when the clashes erupted.

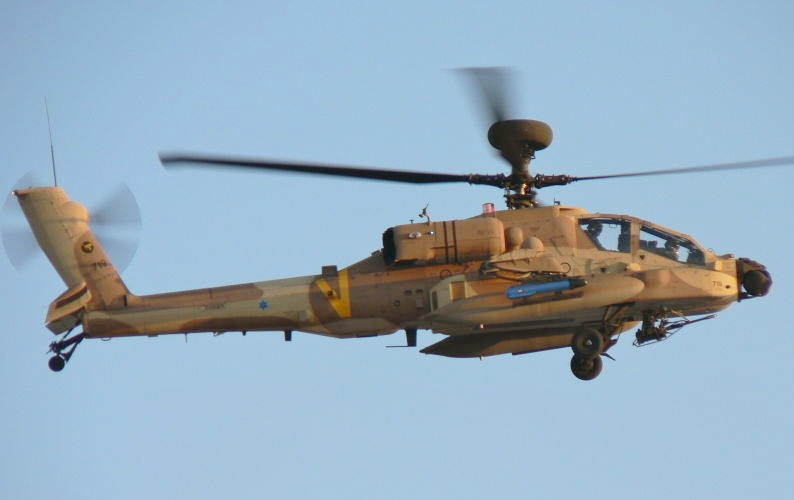
An Israeli Apache AH-64D.

According to an IDF spokesperson, "the Lebanese Armed Forces (LAF) fired at an IDF position along the Lebanese border in northern Israel. The soldiers were in Israeli territory, carrying out routine maintenance and was pre-coordinated with UNIFIL." Only then, the spokesperson said, did Israel return fire. The Israel Defense Forces released aerial footage that claims to show the IDF soldiers were standing in Israeli territory when fired on, and "did not cross the Lebanese border." United Nations representatives confirmed the photos. Israeli analysts speculated that a renegade commander sympathetic to Hezbollah may have ordered the attack.

According to Lebanon army officials, Israeli soldiers crossed into Lebanon to uproot trees which according to Israel blocked their view and made surveillance over Lebanon border posts uneasy. A military spokesperson said that upon of overpassing of the border by Israeli troops the Lebanese border defence troops as of first procedure fired warning shots and requested the Israeli troops to cease their unsanctioned actions, however the Israeli troops immediately started a targeted fire on their position, forcing them to return fire in defense. A Lebanese Army official later officially confirmed that Lebanese troops had fired warning shots first, after the Israelis had crossed into Lebanese territory.

=== Allegations of planned ambush ===
If this incident was not planned in advance, why did field commanders in the Lebanese army bother to dispatch journalists to the area and ensure that cameras were present at the site?

— IDF spokesperson

A report released by senior Israeli officials in Jerusalem accuses the Lebanese army of taking "advantage of the fact that the IDF delayed several hours of maintenance work" near the Lebanese border, to "plan and prepare an ambush" against IDF troops. According to the report, the Israeli Army contacted UNIFIL at 6:00 on August 3 to inform them of maintenance work to commence three hours later. UNIFIL representatives responded that their forces needed extra time to prepare for the IDF presence and requested the IDF delay work until 11:00. The Israeli army delayed the operation by several hours. UNIFIL commanders then told the Lebanese Army of the IDF plans. At this point it was suspected by Israel that the Lebanese military used the extra time to prepare an ambush, even inviting journalists and photographers to the site to observe its aftermath.

IDF officers alleged that Lebanese military called in journalists and photographers in advance of the confrontation. Officials have questioned the large presence of journalists and broadcast trucks at the scene before the clash ensued:

== Confrontation ==
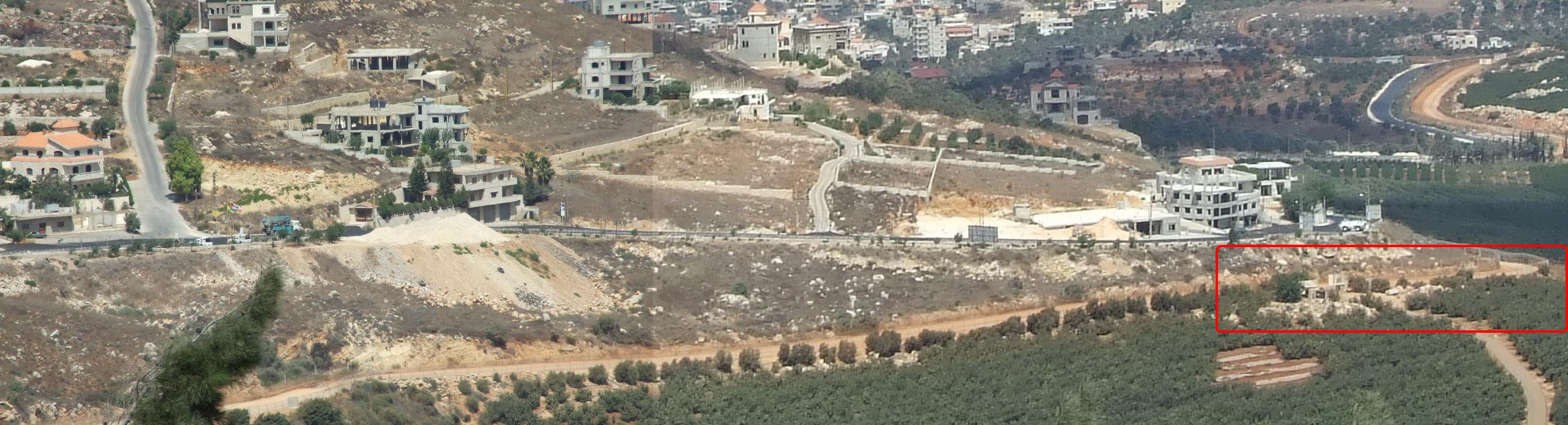
Village of Odaisseh in Lebanon, as seen from Misgav Am, Israel. Area of the 2010 Israel–Lebanon border clash marked with red

According to the Israeli military the fighting began when a Lebanese Army sniper unit fired on an IDF observation post inside Israeli territory after receiving authorization from Lebanese commanders. The gunshots were fired from a range of about 700 meters from a building in the Lebanese village of Odaisseh. An Israeli military spokeswoman said there were about two or three sniper shots, and that the surprise attack seemed like an ambush. IDF soldiers immediately fired on Lebanese troops with small arms, and the Lebanese returned fire.

The IDF launched a heavy artillery attack targeting Lebanese Army outposts, claiming that the outposts held a "dominating position" and could have posed a threat to troops still on the ground. Israeli artillery fired at an army position in Odaisseh. One artillery shell hit a civilian area.

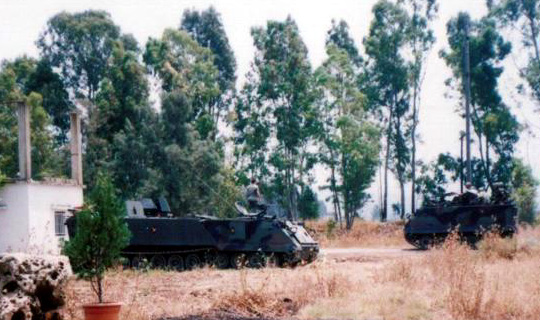
Lebanese M113 APCs, like those destroyed in the incident.

Several minutes after the confrontation began, an Israeli Air Force AH-64 Apache helicopter gunship attacked a Lebanese Armed Forces command center in the southern Lebanese town of Al Taybeh, destroying several M113 armored personnel carriers.

Throughout these assaults, the IDF had been receiving a number of requests from the senior command levels of the Lebanese Army, asking for a cease-fire to allow the Lebanese to evacuate their casualties. Later, the IDF agreed to a cease-fire, and halted its attacks. Half an hour later, a Lebanese Army rocket-propelled grenade (RPG) team fired a single round at an Israeli tank, but missed. This tank then fired at the Lebanese position from which the attack had come.

== UNIFIL report ==
United Nations Interim Force in Lebanon (UNIFIL) officials in Lebanon said that the IDF informed the organization of its intention to conduct routine maintenance in the area where the Lebanese Army opened fire on IDF soldiers. UNIFIL said Israeli soldiers were inside Israeli territory when the border clashes erupted.

UNIFIL established ... that the trees being cut by the Israeli army are located south of the Blue Line on the Israeli side.

— UNIFIL military spokesman Lieutenant-Colonel Naresh Bhatt.

UNIFIL personnel later visited the site of the skirmish. According to Israeli officials who spoke to UNIFIL representatives, UNIFIL determined that Lebanese forces had no reason to fire on Israeli troops. Milos Strugar, a diplomat and senior political advisor to UNIFIL Force Commander Alberto Asarta said he "does not believe IDF soldiers crossed the international border during the maintenance work."

== Casualties ==
The casualties of the incident were:

- Israeli reserve battalion commander Lieutenant Colonel Dov Harari was killed in his observation post when he was shot in the head by a Lebanese sniper. Reserve company commander Captain Ezra Lakia was wounded by Lebanese sniper fire as he stood in the same post, sustaining a gunshot wound to the chest.
- Two Lebanese soldiers, Sergeant Robert Elias al Ashi and Sergeant Abdullah Mohammad al Tufaili, were killed in an Israeli helicopter attack on a Lebanese military command center in Al Taybeh several miles from the border. Both soldiers were in an M113 armored personnel carrier when it was hit during the airstrike. Five other Lebanese soldiers were wounded by Israeli retaliatory fire.
- Assaf Abu Rahhal, a journalist for Lebanon's Al-Akhbar newspaper, was killed by Israeli artillery fire in Odaisseh, located several miles behind border.
- Ali Shuaib, a journalist from the Hezbollah-affiliated Al-Manar television station, was moderately wounded in the same artillery attack.

== Reactions ==
=== Israel ===
I see the Lebanese government as directly responsible for this violent provocation against Israel.

— Benjamin Netanyahu, Prime Minister of Israel

Prime Minister Benjamin Netanyahu said that he held the Lebanese government "directly accountable for this violent provocation against Israel." He also added that "Israel responded aggressively, and will do so in the future against any attempt to violate the quiet on [our] northern border, and attack residents of the north and the soldiers who are protecting them."

Defense Minister Ehud Barak warned the Lebanese government against continuing to provoke IDF forces. He added that Israel would not tolerate any attacks on soldiers or citizens within its sovereign territory and also called on the international community to condemn the "criminal act carried out by the Lebanese army."

The Foreign Ministry labeled the incident a "severe violation of UN Security Council Resolution 1701" and only "one of many violations of Resolution 1701, the most severe of which is the massive rearmament of Hizbullah, including the rearmament of Hizbullah units in southern Lebanon." It declared, "Israel holds the Lebanese government responsible for the grave incident, and warns of the consequences should these continue." Foreign Minister Avigdor Lieberman "instructed the Israeli diplomatic delegation to the United Nations to file a protest with the UN Secretary General and the Security Council."

Major General Gadi Eisenkot said "It was a planned ambush by a sniper unit ... this was a provocation by the Lebanese army. We view this fire was a highly grave incident. Our forces responded at once, and immediately after that we resorted to artillery and gunship fire." Israel also filed a complaint with the United Nations, alleging that Lebanese soldiers opened fire despite the IDF having informed UNIFIL forces in advance of its plan to cut down a tree along the border fence.

Former Israeli Defense minister Shaul Mofaz called the incident a "planned terror attack" and said he had "no doubt that Hizbullah was involved in the Lebanese Army's actions." Mofaz also criticized UNIFIL's involvement, stating that their "inability to prevent the Lebanese Army from firing on IDF soldiers proves their incompetence."

Israeli sources also alleged that UNIFIL forces said the Lebanese soldiers had no reason to open fire as the Israeli army was conducting routine activity. Government officials in Israel have criticized the United States and France for supporting Lebanon's military in the wake of the border clash. The US has provided Lebanon with over 400 million in military aid, and France has supplied the military with advanced anti-tank missiles.

Israeli UN Ambassador Daniel Carmon wrote a letter of complaint to the UN that: "These attacks threaten stability, peace, and security in our region. In response to this grave incident that constitutes a blatant violation of UN Security Council resolution 1701, Israel exercised its right of self-defense, responding with the appropriate measures on LAF positions in the area. Israel holds the Government of Lebanon responsible for these attacks and all actions conducted from Lebanese territory. Israel calls upon the international community to exert its influence and to take the necessary measures with the Lebanese authorities to ensure that such provocative violations will not be repeated."

According to Lebanese news sources, the Israeli government demanded that Lebanon court-martial the commander of the Lebanese unit that fired at IDF troops across the border.

=== Lebanon ===
President Michel Suleiman said he would "stand up to Israel's violation of Resolution 1701, whatever the price". He called for both countries to respect the Blue Line. Prime Minister Saad Hariri called the attack a "violation of Lebanese sovereignty and demands." He called for "the United Nations and the international community bear their responsibilities and pressure Israel to stop its aggression." Minister of Social Affairs Selim el-Sayegh of the Phalange party said "The history of the Lebanese army's actions have been defensive ... it is in no position whatsoever to conduct any attack against Israel. It wants only to defend Lebanese territory ... Israel has been doing these activities as a matter of provocation.

I say honestly, that in any place where the Lebanese Army will be assaulted and there's a presence for the resistance, and it is capable, the resistance will not stand silent, or quiet or restrained.

— Hassan Nasrallah, Hezbollah's General Secretary

Lebanese Information Minister Tarek Mitri stated that Lebanon respects the border but contests part of it. He said that while the tree which triggered the confrontation is on the Israeli side of the border, it "is Lebanese territory."

Hezbollah's Hassan Nasrallah declared that in the future his group would not "stand silent" in any future attacks against the LAF and that "The Israeli hand that targets the Lebanese army will be cut off. [However] I don't expect a war to happen soon...but there are reasons for worry." He added that "We told our militants to hold back, not to do anything. [But] From now on, if the army is attacked in any area where the resistance [Hezbollah] has a presence or a say, we will not stand by idly." In addition to his support for the army he said "We contacted the president and the army command and told them that the party is at their service."

The Higher Defence Council chief, General Said Eid, said Lebanon stood ready to confront Israeli aggression "by all available means."

After the United States House of Representatives voted to suspend military aid to Lebanon, the Lebanese government stated that it would reject any future U.S. military aid conditioned on Lebanon agreeing not to use it against Israel.

=== International organizations ===
The European Union urged restraint from both sides.

The head of the United Nations peacekeeping operations Alain le Roy said that UNIFIL "established...that the trees being cut by the Israeli army are located south of the Blue Line on the Israeli side," and that the Israeli army gave notification of "several hours...by the Israeli authorities of their intention to do this operation, and immediately as procedure we informed the Lebanese side." UNIFIL then asked Israel to delay cutting down the trees in order to "facilitate an agreement between the two parties." Though the Israeli army delayed the operation by several hours, le Roy said the UN would have liked a longer delay. UNIFIL Spokesman Neeraj Singh confirmed the firefight and urged both sides to use "maximum restraint." He added that "UNIFIL peacekeepers are in the area and are trying to ascertain the circumstances of the incident and any possible casualties. Our immediate priority at this time is to restore calm in the area." The United Nations Security Council held a backdoor meeting, and called on all parties to practice "utmost restraint". Following initial investigation of the incident, UNIFIL confirmed the Israeli claim that the soldiers were inside Israeli territory when the clashes erupted.

- Reports said UNIFIL confirmed that the IDF informed them of the intention to conduct routine maintenance. According to Israeli officials who spoke to UNIFIL representatives, UNIFIL determined that Lebanese forces had no reason to fire on Israeli troops. UNIFIL military spokesman Lieutenant-Colonel Naresh Bhatt said "UNIFIL established ... that the trees being cut by the Israeli army are located south of the Blue Line on the Israeli side." However, the next day UNIFIL issued a statement saying it is still conducting an investigation in the area. Milos Struger, the political adviser to UNIFIL said Lebanese forces had been advised of the brush-clearing operation several hours in advance.
- The United Nations peacekeeping force in south Lebanon has said that it wants to clearly mark the boundary between Israel and Lebanon. UNIFIL force commander Maj. Gen. Alberto Asarta Cuevas said that he met with representatives of the Lebanese and Israeli armies to discuss the UN-drawn Blue Line boundary. The Blue Line is not marked clearly. A fence Israel erected to separate the countries does not always match the official boundary.

=== International reactions ===
Political reactions

- Egypt – Foreign Minister Ahmed Aboul Gheit urged UNIFIL to calm the situation, and prevent any further Israeli violations of Resolution 1701.
- Iran – In a statement, the Iranian Foreign Ministry said, "The Islamic Republic of Iran strongly condemns the Zionist regime's incursion in the southern regions of Lebanon which resulted in the martyrdom of a handful of children of the Lebanese army." It added that the "hysterical assault" by Israel raised an existing concern about a "new adventure" against Lebanon.
- Morocco – The Moroccan government condemned Israel for the incident and declared its support for Lebanon, adding that the event would have negative effects on the peace process in the Middle East.
- Jordan – Jordanian Prime Minister Samir Rifai emphasized the Jordanian government's support for Lebanon and rejection of any aggression against the country, but warned of the effect any future clashes could have on attempts to work towards peace in the region. The Jordanian cabinet released a statement saying that it was "deeply concerned about the dangerous escalation in Lebanese territory."

The firing by the Lebanese Armed Forces was wholly unjustified and unwarranted.

— US State Department spokesman P. J. Crowley.

- United States – President Barack Obama conveyed his condolences through Israeli Defense Minister Ehud Barak to the family of Harari. State Department spokesman Phillip Crowley stated that "we deeply regret the loss of life. We urge both sides to exercise maximum restraint to avoid an escalation, and maintain the ceasefire that is now in place." He also expressed concerns that the incident might expand into "something more significant," and that U.S. officials had been trying to make sure it went no further. A senior American official in Washington said that, based on what had been learned so far, the Lebanese military appeared to have been responsible for starting the gunfire.

== See also ==
- Korean axe murder incident
