= Misgav Am hostage crisis =

1980 hostage crisis in Israel

- Part of Palestinian insurgency in South Lebanon
- The attack site
- Native name: הפיגוע במשגב עם
- Location: 33°14′52″N 35°32′54″E; Misgav Am, Israel
- Date: April 7–8, 1980 (1 day)
- Attack type: Hostage-taking
- Weapons: AK-47 assault rifles and hand grenades
- Deaths: 3 Israelis (+5 attackers)
- Injuries: 11 Israeli soldiers
- Perpetrator: Arab Liberation Front claimed responsibility
- No. of participants: 5 Palestinian militants

The Misgav Am hostage crisis, which began during the night of April 7, 1980, was a raid carried out by a squad of five Palestinian militants belonging to the Iraqi-backed Arab Liberation Front militant organization, on the northern Israeli kibbutz of Misgav Am in which the militants captured a group of toddlers and babies in the children's sleeping quarters of the kibbutz and held them as hostages. The event ended the next day with the takeover of the terrorist stronghold by Israeli special forces.

During the incident three Israelis were killed: a two-year-old, and a 38-year-old kibbutz member were murdered, and one Israeli soldier died in a rescue attempt. Four other children, a kibbutz member, and 11 Israeli soldiers were injured during the attack.

== Details of the attack ==
During the night of Monday, April 7, 1980, a squad of five Palestinian militants, belonging to the Iraqi-backed Arab Liberation Front militant organization, armed with AK-47 assault rifles and hand grenades, cut the border fence between Israel and Lebanon at around 1:00 am. The squad then crossed the border and managed to sneak into Kibbutz Misgav Am, located in northern Israel. Upon reaching the center of the kibbutz undetected, the squad arrived at the children's sleeping quarters, where children aged 1½ to 3 slept, supervised by some of their parents.

At the entrance to the dormitory, the militant squad encountered the kibbutz secretary Sammy (Samuel) Shani, who happened to be at the site repairing the building's light fixtures. With only a screwdriver in his hand, he attempted to block the entrance, but was shot dead by the militants.

The militants then entered the building and killed two-year-old Eyal Gluska, and snatched two babies from their cribs (one of whom was Sammy Shani's two-month-old son). The militants ran up to the second floor together with the two babies they took, where they barricaded themselves, and where five more toddlers and an adult named Meir Peretz were sleeping. Kibbutz members managed to rescue several women and children from the building during the raid.

At about 2:30 am, Israeli military forces surrounded the dormitory building and began to negotiate with the militants.

=== Takeover operation ===
In all, two rescue attempts were made. The first was carried out by the Sayeret Golani unit of the Golani Brigade and failed. During that attempt, the Sayeret Golani team's combat medic, 19 year old Eldad Tsafrir, was killed. Tsafrir's body remained lying at the entrance to the building, as no one was capable of evacuating it.

After the first rescue attempt, the militants began using loudspeakers to declare their ransom demands. They read the names of prisoners they wanted released from Israeli prisons, they demanded a plane to fly them out of the country, and also asked that the Romanian ambassador be involved in the negotiations.

After lengthy negotiations, at around 10:00 pm on April 8, a team from the Sayeret Matkal special forces unit, under the command of Major General Uzi Dayan, broke into the building through several openings and retook the building in a raid that lasted only two minutes. During this takeover, all of the militants were killed and all hostages were rescued. Six Sayeret Matkal soldiers were injured during the takeover. During the operation, one of the militants shot Meir Peretz in his legs, while Peretz was tied up and lying on the floor, and then blew himself up using a hand grenade.

== Victims ==
=== Israeli civilian fatalities ===
- Eyal Gluska, 2, of Misgav Am
- Sammy (Samuel) Shani, 36, of Misgav Am

=== Israeli military fatalities ===
- Sgt. Eldad Tsafrir, 19, of Tel Aviv

== The perpetrators ==
In an announcement in Beirut after the attack, the Iraqi-backed Arab Liberation Front, a radical guerrilla group within the PLO, claimed responsibility for the attack and stated that the action was carried out with the aim of releasing 50 Palestinians from Israeli prisons.

== Israeli retaliation ==
Following the attack, Israel carried out Operation High Voltage (Hebrew: מבצע מתח גבוה, romanized: Mivtza Metach Gavoha) on April 17, 1980, in which seaborne Israeli Shayetet 13 commandos raided and destroyed the Ras el-Sheikh Palestinian guerrilla base in southern Lebanon (20 kilometers north of Tyre and about 40 kilometers north of the Israeli border). An IDF spokesman stated that the base was used as a supply center and staging base for terror raids in Israel. Six guerrillas were killed during the operation.

== See also ==
- Palestinian political violence
