= Emily Nasrallah =

Lebanese writer (1931–2018)

- Born: Emily Daoud Abi Rached; 6 July 1931; Kaukaba, composite South Governorate, French Lebanon
- Died: 13 March 2018 (aged 86); Beirut, Beirut Governorate, Lebanon
- Occupations: Novelist; journalist; short-story writer
- Spouse: Philip Nasrallah (m. 1957)
- Children: 4
- Writing career
- Period: 1962–2018
- Notable awards: Goethe Medal; 2017

Emily Daoud Nasrallah (Arabic: إميلي داود نصر الله; née Abi Rached [أبي راشد]; 6 July 1931 – 13 March 2018) was a Lebanese writer and women's rights activist.

She graduated from the Beirut College for Women (now the Lebanese American University) with an associate degree in arts in 1956. Two years later, she obtained a BA in education and literature from the American University of Beirut. She published her first novel "Birds of September" in 1962; the book was instantly acclaimed, and won three Arabic literary prizes. "Flight Against Time" was Nasrallah's first novel to be translated into English, published by the Canada-based Ragweed Press. Nasrallah became a prolific writer, publishing many novels, children's stories, and short story collections, touching on themes such as family, village life, war, emigration, and women's rights. The latter was a subject she has maintained support for throughout her life.

== Biography ==
=== Early life ===
Emily Daoud Abi Rached was born in the village of Kaukaba in South Lebanon, to Loutfa, née Abou Nasr, and Daoud Abi Rached. She was raised in al-Kfeir on western foot of Mount Hermon in southern Lebanon. The eldest of six children, she tended the village fields with her parents; an experience that influenced her later work. She witnessed the village's gradual depopulation and family members emigrating in search better opportunities due to limited educational and professional prospects. Kfeir's public school admitted students at the age of six, but Emily's early passion for learning led her to eavesdrop on classes conducted near her parental home at the age of four. She then started reciting poems and stories she heard to her father and his friends. Her maternal uncle, Ayub Abou Nasr, a fellow of the New York Pen League took a special interest in her education when he returned from emigration due to a neurological illness. Recognizing Emily's talent, he took a keen interest in her education, encouraging her through various means; for instance, he tasked her with writing descriptive essays of Mount Hermon to nurture her imagination and enhance her writing skills.

After finishing her studies at the elementary public school of the village which only offered education till the third elementary grade at that time, Nasrallah wrote a letter to her second maternal uncle, an expatriate businessman in West Virginia, expressing her interest in pursuing higher education and explaining her family's dire financial circumstances that prevented her from paying private schooling fees. Her uncle granted her wish and paid for her tuition. She left her hometown when she was sixteen years of age to pursue her education at the Choueifat National College, a boarding school in the suburbs of Beirut. She studied in the Choueifat school for four years, during this period her passion for literature deepened as she became an avid reader. She compensated for the absence of a library in her hometown with spending many hours at the Choueifat school library; since she had no resources to buy books, she smuggled Mikha'il Na'ima and Khalil Gibran books – which would influence her writing career greatly – from the college library in order to read them illicitly in her bed. Her fondness of reading was ever-growing, she admitted enjoying the 'interesting reading material' found in the journal and magazine shreds that enveloped dragées and other sweets. Nasrallah credited Nassim Nasr, her Arabic language teacher, for helping to develop her writing skills and orienting her through his "red correction pen harsh criticism". He was the first to publish her writings in the Telegraph, a local Beirutine magazine, in 1949 and 1950; he also encouraged and selected her to participate in composition and rhetoric contests.

=== Education and career ===
In 1955, Amal Makdessy Kortas (director of the Ahliah school) offered Nasrallah a job and lodging at the school in Wadi Abu Jamil; she taught for two hours daily at the school where Hanan al-Shaykh had been her pupil. She fell short of paying her college education tuition and was financially aided by her friend and colleague at the Ahlia school, Jalila Srour. She also tutored, wrote magazine articles in Sawt al Mar'a and lent her voice to the national radio (al-itha'a al-lubnaniyya) to repay her debt to Jalila and pay for her college education at the Beirut College for Women and the American University of Beirut where she majored with a Bachelor of Arts in education and literature in 1958. After graduation, Nasrallah's parents wanted her to come back to Kfeir and teach at the village school as they did not wish for her to live alone in the city; she decided otherwise and came back to Beirut where she tutored Edvique Shayboub's children. (Note: Edvique Shayboub was a contemporary journalist and novelist, editor in chief of Sawt el Mar'a magazine) Shayboub, editor in chief of Sawt al Mar'a (Woman's voice) magazine, offered her the opportunity to publish articles in her magazine and encouraged her to settle in Beirut.

In 1955, Nasrallah was introduced to Jacqueline Nahas, a journalist at as-Sayyad publishing house, and started her 15 years long career at as-Sayyad (the hunter) magazine writing in the society news section; she also contributed articles to Al Anwar newspaper. Between 1973 and 1975, she worked as cultural and public relation consultant at the Beirut University College before joining Fayruz magazine from 1981 till 1987 as a feature editor.

== Personal life ==
Emily married Philip Nasrallah, a chemist from Zahleh in 1957 while still in college. The couple had four children: Ramzi, Maha, Khalil, and Mona. She never left Beirut, even at the peak of the Lebanese civil war. She became one of the Beirut Decentrists. (Note: miriam cooke coined the term "Beirut decentrists" for the Lebanese women writers as they have been twice "decentred". Once because they are "scattered all over a self-destructing city" and secondly because they are excluded from literary canon and social discourse.")

== Awards and honors ==
Nasrallah's A cat's diary figured on the 1998 IBBY honor list. The book depicts the horrors of war in Beirut from the viewpoint of Zicco (Zeeko) a Siamese cat and his friend, the girl Mona. On 28 August 2017, as part of Language is Key endorsed by the Goethe-Institut, Nasrallah was accorded the Goethe Medal, an official decoration of the Federal Republic of Germany honoring non-Germans for meritorious contributions in the spirit of the institute. On 6 February 2018, President Michel Aoun decorated her with the Cedar Medal of Honor, Commander Rank. When for health reasons, Nasrallah was unable to attend the award event scheduled to be held at the Presidential Palace, President Aoun sent Minister of Justice Salim Jreissaty to represent him in Nasrallah's home, where the decoration ceremony took place.

== Works ==
=== Novels ===
- Tuyur Aylul (The birds of September) was Nasrallah's first novel it received critical acclaim and three Arabic literary prizes within the same year of publication in 1962; the prizes are: Laureate Best Novel, the Said Akl Prize, and Friends of the Book Prize.
- Shajarat al-Difla (The olenader tree), published in 1968.
- al-Rahina (The hostage), 1974
- Tilka l-dhikrayat (Those memories), 1980
- al-Iqlaʿ ʿaks al-zaman (Flight against time, translated by Issa J. Boullata), 1981
- al-Jamr al-ghafi (The sleeping ember), 1995
- Ma Hadatha Fi Jouzour Tamaya (What Happened in the Tamaya Islands)

=== Short stories ===
- Jazirat al-Wahm (The island of illusion), 1973
- al-Yanbouʿ (The Spring), 1978
- al-Mar'a fi 17 qissa (Women in 17 stories), 1984
- al-Tahuna al-da'iʿa (The lost mill, translated by Issa J. Boullata), 1984
- Khubzuna al-yami (Our daily bread), 1988
- Mahattat al-rahil (Stations on a journey), 1996
- Rawat lia al-ayyam (Days recounted), 1997
- Al-Layali al-Ghajariyya (Gypsy Nights), 1998
- Awraq Minsiah (Forgotten papers)
- Aswad wa Abyiad (Black and White)
- Riyah janoubiyyah (Southern Winds)

=== Children's literature ===
- Shadi as-Saghir (Little Shadi), 1977
- al-Bahira (The Resplendent Flower)
- Yawmiyat Hirr (A cat's diary), 1988
- ʿala Bissat al Thalj (On a Snow Carpet)
- Al Ghazala (The Gazelle)
- Anda al Khawta (Anda the Fool)
- Ayna tathhab Anda? (Where does Anda go?)
- Al Walad (The Child)

2020

=== Non-fiction ===
- Nisaa' Ra'idat – Volumes 1,2 and 3 Biographies of pioneer women From the East
- Nisaa' Ra'idat – Volumes 4,5 and 6 Biographies of pioneer women From the West
- Fil Bal (Recollections of start-up of Journalistic Career)
- Al Makan (The Place) autobiography of early childhood. 2018
