= Military Cabinet of Michel Aoun =

A transitional military cabinet was formed on 22 September 1988, the last day of Amine Gemayel presidency, dismissing the current cabinet headed by Salim Hoss. The Prime Minister was also General Michel Aoun, the commander of the army at the time.

== Composition ==
Military Cabinet of Michel Aoun
Portfolio	Minister	Political affiliation	Religious affiliation	Governorate
Prime Minister	Michel Aoun	Military	Maronite	Mount Lebanon
Defence	Michel Aoun	Military	Maronite	Mount Lebanon
Information	Michel Aoun	Military	Maronite	Mount Lebanon
Deputy Prime Minister	Issam Abu Jamra	Military	Greek Orthodox	South
Telecommunications	Issam Abu Jamra	Military	Greek Orthodox	South
Housing	Issam Abu Jamra	Military	Greek Orthodox	South
Economy	Issam Abu Jamra	Military	Greek Orthodox	South
Finance	Edgar Maalouf	Military	Greek Catholic	Mount Lebanon
Social Affairs	Edgar Maalouf	Military	Greek Catholic	Mount Lebanon
Health	Edgar Maalouf	Military	Greek Catholic	Mount Lebanon
Industry	Edgar Maalouf	Military	Greek Catholic	Mount Lebanon
Foreign Affairs	Mohammed Nabil Quraytem	~~Military~~	~~Sunni~~	~~Beirut~~
Education	Mohammed Nabil Quraytem	~~Military~~	~~Sunni~~	~~Beirut~~
Interior	Mohammed Nabil Quraytem	~~Military~~	~~Sunni~~	~~Beirut~~
Energy and Water	Lotfi Jaber	~~Military~~	~~Shia~~	~~Beirut~~
Agriculture	Lotfi Jaber	~~Military~~	~~Shia~~	~~Beirut~~
Justice	Lotfi Jaber	~~Military~~	~~Shia~~	~~Beirut~~
Public Works	Mahmoud Abu Dargham	~~Military~~	~~Druze~~	~~Mount Lebanon~~
Labour	Mahmoud Abu Dargham	~~Military~~	~~Druze~~	~~Mount Lebanon~~
Tourism	Mahmoud Abu Dargham	~~Military~~	~~Druze~~	~~Mount Lebanon~~
