= Mauritanian News Agency =

Mauritania's state news agency

Mauritanian News Agency (AMI)
- Arabic: الوكالة الموريتانية للأنباء; French: Agence Mauritanienne d'Information

Agency overview
- Formed: 1975
- Headquarters: Nouakchott
- Website: ami.mr/en/

The Mauritanian News Agency (AMI), (Arabic: الوكالة الموريتانية للأنباء, romanized: al-Wakālah al-Mūrītānīyah lil-Anbāʼ) was established in 1975 under the name "Agence Mauritanienne de Presse" (AMP). It is the state-run and official news agency with headquarters based in Nouakchott.

The agency provides its customers with a news feed in Arabic, French and more recently English, covering national, regional, and international events. It has a network of correspondents and regional offices covering the country. The Mauritanian News Agency also provides an SMS information service. In addition to its agency services, the AMI publishes two newspapers and has developed a cooperation with Maghreb news agencies, the Federation of Arab News Agencies (FANA), the Alliance of Mediterranean News Agencies (AMAN).

== See also ==
- Federation of Arab News Agencies (FANA)
