= Federation of Arab News Agencies =

Regional organization

Federation of Arab News Agencies FANA اتحاد وكالات الأنباء العربية فانا
- Logo
- Headquarters: Beirut, Lebanon
- Official languages: Arabic
- Type: Regional organization
- Members: 19 states of the Arab League: Algeria; Bahrain; Egypt; Iraq; Jordan; Kuwait; Lebanon; Libya; Mauritania; Morocco; Oman; Palestine; Qatar; Saudi Arabia; Sudan; Tunisia; United Arab Emirates; Yemen; Syria

Leaders
  - Secretary-General: Abdullah bin Fahd bin Mohammed Al-Hussein
- Establishment: 1975; 51 years ago
- Website fananews.com

The Federation of Arab News Agencies (FANA; Arabic: اتحاد وكالات الأنباء العربية, romanized: Ittiḥād Wikālāt al-Anbāʾ al-ʿArabiyya, abbr. فانا), a branch of the Arab League, is a membership organization for Arabic-language, national news agencies, currently of 19 members and established in 1975 in Beirut, Lebanon.

== Mission ==
FANA's mission is to promote cooperation among its members and around the world.

FANA reflects development of similar regional groups including the Alliance of Mediterranean News Agencies (AMAN), the European Alliance of News Agencies (EANA), and the Organization of Asia-Pacific News Agencies (OANA).

== History ==
Efforts to form a union of Arab national news agencies started on October 28, 1964, in Cairo, Egypt, and resulted in a conference in Amman, Jordan, in 1965. In January 1974, the League of Arab States ("Arab League") called for a second conference, held in Baghdad, Iraq, in April 1974. During a third conference in Beirut in 1975, the Federation of Arab News Agencies formed and made Beirut its headquarters, whose founding members came from Jordan, Tunisia, Algeria, Saudi Arabia, Syria, Iraq, Palestine, Lebanon, Libya, Morocco, and Yemen.

== Organization ==
FANA holds an annual General Assembly every November, while general managers of its national news agency members meet semi-annually. FANA held the 49th Conference of its General Assembly in Abu Dhab in November 2022 with the participation of the 14 news agencies' directors or their representatives.

=== Members ===
Joining dates of Arab League members; the Comoros (circled) joined in 1993. 1940s 1950s 1960s 1970s

FANA's official English website has varying current members listed, which include:

1. Algeria – ⁣Algeria Press Service (APS)
2. Bahrain – ⁣Bahrain News Agency (BNA)
3. Egypt – ⁣Middle East News Agency (MENA)
4. Iraq – ⁣Iraqi News Agency (INA)
5. Jordan – ⁣Jordan News Agency (PETRA)
6. Kuwait – ⁣Kuwait News Agency (KUNA)
7. Lebanon – ⁣National News Agency (NNA)
8. Libya – Libyan News Agency (LANA) (AKA Jamahiriya News Agency)
9. Mauritania – ⁣Mauritanian News Agency (AMI)
10. Morocco – ⁣Maghreb Arabe Press (MAP)
11. Oman – ⁣Oman News Agency (ONA)
12. Palestine – ⁣Palestine News Agency (WAFA)
13. Qatar – ⁣Qatar News Agency (QNA)
14. Saudi Arabia – ⁣Saudi Press Agency (SPA)
15. Syria – ⁣Syrian Arab News Agency (SANA)
16. Sudan – ⁣Sudan News Agency (SUNA)
17. Tunisia – ⁣Tunis Afrique Presse (TAP)
18. UAE – ⁣Emirates News Agency (WAM)
19. Yemen – ⁣Saba News Agency (SABA)

Non-members (but Arab League members):

1. Comoros⁣ – no national news agency
2. Djibouti – Agence Djiboutienne d'Information
3. Somalia – Somali National News Agency (SONNA)

=== Leadership ===
FANA's current head is Abdullah bin Fahd bin Mohammed al-Hussein.

FANA's leadership has included:

- Ziyad Abdel Fattah (1978–1979)
- Nasr Taha Mustafa (2003–2005)

== Awards ==
- 2006: Best Photo to Layal Najib (1983–2006)

== See also ==
- Arab League
