= Qatar News Agency =

State-run news agency

- Type: State-owned news agency
- Country: Qatar
- Founded: 25 May 1975; 51 years ago
- Headquarters: Doha
- Parent: Ministry of Information and Communications Technology
- Official website: www.qna.org.qa/en (in English)

Qatar News Agency (QNA) (Arabic: وكالة الأنباء القطرية (قنا), romanized: Wakalat al-Anba al-Qatariya (QANA)) is a state-run Qatari news agency.

== History and profile ==
Qatar News Agency was established by a decree issued on 25 May 1975. It is attached to the Ministry of Information. The former parent ministry was the Ministry of Foreign Affairs. The headquarters of the agency is in Doha. The Agency has been headed by Ahmed Saeed Jaber Al-Rumaihi since October 2021.

By 1980, QNA signed collaborative agreements with the news agencies of Oman, the United Arab Emirates, France and Tunisia, in addition to opening a bureau in Tunis, the administrative center of the Arab League at that time.

The agency provides news in Arabic and English. It has also Spanish and Portuguese news services.

=== Administration ===
Emiri Resolution No. (50) of 2014 was issued regarding the organization of the management of the Qatar News Agency. In accordance with this decision, the agency's management structure has been transformed to consist of:

1. Office of the Director General,
2. Internal Audit Department,
3. Planning and Quality Department,
4. Legal Affairs Department,
5. Public Relations and Communication Department,
6. Shared Services Department,
7. Data Analysis and Documentation Department,
8. Editorial and Media Monitoring Department,
9. News Department,
10. External Media Affairs Department,
11. Technical Affairs Department.

== Past and present administrators ==
Below is a list of directors of QNA who have led the agency since its establishment:

1. Othman Abu Zaid 1975–1980 (Egyptian: Director and Editor-in-Chief)
2. Issa bin Saeed Al Kuwari 1980–1994 (Director and Editor-in-Chief)
3. Ahmed Jassim Al Hamar 1994–2007 (Director and Editor-in-Chief)
4. Sheikh Jabr bin Yusuf Al Thani 2007–2011 (Director-General)
5. Ahmed Saeed Al Buainain 2011–2017 (Director-General)
6. Yousef Al Maliki 2017–2021 (Director-General)
7. Ahmed bin Said Jabor Al Rumaihi 2021–present (Director-General)

== Membership ==
Qatar News Agency is a member of the Federation of Arab News Agencies (FANA), which aims to strengthen Arab media, in order to develop Arab News Agencies through the techniques and technology that they use. QNA is also a member of the Non-Aligned News Agencies Pool (NANAP), the Organization of Asia-Pacific News Agencies (OANA), the Union of OIC News Agencies and the International Federation of Journalists (IFJ).

== May 2017 incident ==
On 24 May Qatar stated that the website was hacked by an unknown source and that fake stories on sensitive issues were published before the site went offline. Subsequently, Saudi Arabia, Egypt and the United Arab Emirates blocked Qatari media, including broadcaster Al Jazeera. On 5 June Saudi Arabia, Egypt, the United Arab Emirates, Yemen, Libya, Bahrain, and Maldives severed their relations with Qatar accusing it of supporting terrorism. In report published by The United Nations Global Counter-Terrorism Coordination Compact, New York in 2022, data from the report displayed multiple initiatives by Qatar for countering terrorism such as supporting member states and regional organizations in developing their counter-terrorism strategies that reflect all four Pillars of the UN Global Counter-Terrorism Strategy and in accordance with relevant General Assembly and Security Council resolutions. The report also included ensuring these strategies aim to counter terrorism in a holistic, comprehensive and integrated manner, in line with international law, including international human rights law, international humanitarian law and international refugee law, while also ensuring gender equality and youth empowerment through engagement with civil society, academia, think tanks and the private sector.

According to Qatar-based Al Jazeera, hackers posted fake remarks on the official Qatar News Agency attributed to the Emir of Qatar, Sheikh Tamim bin Hamad Al Thani, that expressed support for Iran, Hamas, Hezbollah and Israel. The emir was quoted as saying: "Iran represents a regional and Islamic power that cannot be ignored and it is unwise to face up against it. It is a big power in the stabilization of the region." Qatar reported that the statements were false and did not know their origin. Despite this, the remarks were widely publicized in the various Arab news media, including UAE-based Sky News Arabia and Al Arabiya. On 3 June 2017, the Twitter account of Bahraini foreign minister Khalid bin Ahmed Al Khalifa was hacked.

Initially, it was alleged that intelligence gathered by the US security agencies indicated that Russian hackers were behind the intrusion first reported by the Qataris. However, a U.S. official briefed on the inquiry told The New York Times that it "was unclear whether the hackers were state-sponsored", and The Guardian diplomatic editor Patrick Wintour reported that "It is believed that the Russian government was not involved in the hacks; instead, freelance hackers were paid to undertake the work on behalf of some other state or individual." A U.S. diplomat said that Russia and its ally Iran stood to benefit from sowing discord among U.S. allies in the region, "particularly if they made it more difficult for the United States to use Qatar as a major base." The FBI sent a team of investigators to Doha to help the Qatari government investigate the hacking incident. Later, The New York Times reported that the hacking incidents may be part of a long-running cyberwar between Qatar and other Gulf countries that was only revealed to the public during the recent incidents, and noted that Saudi and UAE media picked up the statement made by the hacked media in less than 20 minutes, and began interviewing many well-prepared commentators against Qatar.

On 16 July, The Washington Post revealed that US intelligence officials pin-pointed the hack as being carried out by the UAE. The intelligence officials stated that the hacking was discussed among Emirati officials on 23 May, one day before the operation took place. The UAE denied any involvement in the hacking. On 26 August 2017 it was announced that five individuals allegedly involved in the hacking were arrested in Turkey.

== See also ==
- Federation of Arab News Agencies (FANA)
