= Middle East News Agency =

Egyptian news agency

- Wakalt Inbaa al Sharq al Awsat وكالة أنباء الشرق الأوسط (أ.ش.أ)

Agency overview
- Formed: 15 December 1955; 70 years ago
- Jurisdiction: Egyptian government
- Headquarters: Cairo
- Parent agency: Ministry of Information
- Website: mena.org.eg

The Middle East News Agency (MENA) is a news agency based in Egypt. It is run and controlled by the Egyptian government.

== History ==
The MENA was founded on 15 December 1955 as a joint stock company owned by Egyptian press establishments. The agency, based in Cairo, began its operations on 28 February 1956. The owner of the agency became the Egyptian government in 1962. In 1978, the agency's owner became the Shura Council. In 1980, a board of directors was established and began to run the agency. It was later attached to the Ministry of Information.

== Operations ==
Mustafa Naguib is among the former chiefs of the agency. Mahfuz Al Ansari also served in the post. In July 2005, he was replaced by Abdullah Hassan as editor-in-chief. In June 2014, Alaa Heidar was appointed editor-in-chief of the agency.

The MENA is the member of the Federation of Arab News Agencies that includes the national news agencies of 18 Arab countries. The agency had cooperation with around 25 news agencies in the 1990s. It is published in three languages: Arabic, English and French.

It has following six major services: (1) Local Arabic news of which target audience is those subscribers living in Egypt and covers political, social, economic, culture and sports news in the Arab world, the Middle East and internationally. (2) Press services which include features news analysis, and photo services and international sectors such as culture, art, science, sports and history. (3) Publications in print which informs the subscribers about printed daily, biweekly and weekly. (4) Cairo Press Review which is a daily English-language publication, offering news published in the Egyptian newspapers. (5) Party Press Review news which is a biweekly publication in English about the main news published in the party newspapers in Egypt and (6) The MEN economic magazine which is a weekly English-language publication and offers the main economic news concerning those who are part of the economy of Egypt.

On 5 February 2014, the agency started a news website, called Bawabet Sharq Al Awsat.

MENA is member of Alliance of Mediterranean News Agencies.

== See also ==
- Mass media in Egypt
