= Jordan News Agency =

Jordanian national news agency

Hashemite Kingdom of Jordan Jordan News Agency (PETRA) وكالة الأنباء الأردنية
- Logo

Agency overview
- Formed: 16 July 1969; 57 years ago
- Headquarters: Amman (Jordan)
- Employees: 260 (2010)
- Minister responsible: Samih Maaita, Minister of State for Media Affairs and Communications
- Agency executive: Faisal AlShboul, Director
- Website: www.petra.gov.jo

The Jordan News Agency (Arabic: وكالة الأنباء الأردنية) (PETRA; Arabic: بترا) is the news agency of Jordan.

== History ==
Petra was established on 16 July 1969, as an independent body linked to the ministry of information. It became an independent entity in June 2004, following the dissolution of the ministry of information. A special ordinance was enacted to give PETRA financial and administrative independence and to specify the powers of the agency's board and those of the director general. The new ordinance grants the agency the right to sell some of its services to willing subscribers. The ordinance defines services that could be sold as:

- Items in the photos, news and documents archives
- Special news services requested by local and foreign organizations
- Services of the T.V. unit and leasing its equipments
- Professional, media press and technical training
- Special news bulletin
- Advertisement on its website

== Services provided by the agency ==
- The daily newsletter in Arabic with an average of 100 news stories per day
- The daily newsletter in English with an average of 35 news items per day
- Photographs, an average of 25 photos per day
- Training Center Services
- TV Unit Services
- News archive contains more than one million news
- The digital photo archive contains 110,000 photos
- SMS Service

== Affiliation and correspondence ==
PETRA is an active member in the Federation of Arab News Agencies (FANA), and the Non-Aligned Countries' News Agencies Pool.

The agency has correspondents in Cairo, Copenhagen, New York City, Tokyo, Bonn, Paris, Gaza, Ramallah, Abu Dhabi, Doha, Bahrain, Moscow, London, Kuwait, Kuala Lumpur, Beijing, Sanaa, Bucharest, Baghdad, Manama and Beirut.

== Technical development ==
In the late 1990s, the Jordan News Agency started updating its digital infrastructure. In 1997, the agency created an electronic photo archiving system with support from UNESCO, digitizing about 100,000 of its 500,000 historical photos documenting Jordanian history.

The agency started publishing news and media on its first official website in 1998 after gaining access to the Internet. In order to fix hardware compliance issues from 2000 and combine text documents and photo archives into a single system, it upgraded its database system to a platform known as "Nepras" the following year. Field journalists in regional governorates and overseas bureaus can now submit news reports directly to the central editing room thanks to an update to the Nepras interface in 2001 that enabled remote access via the Internet.

== See also ==
- Federation of Arab News Agencies (FANA)
