= Oman News Agency =

- وكالة الأنباء العمانية

Agency overview
- Formed: 1986
- Headquarters: Ruwi
- Agency executive: Zamzam Al Rashdi, Director General
- Website: https://omannews.gov.om/

Oman News Agency (Arabic: وكالة الأنباء العمانية, ONA) is the official news agency of the government of Oman. It was established by royal decree 39/86 in 1986. It is bilingual in English and Arabic languages.

== See also ==
- Federation of Arab News Agencies (FANA)
