= American Association of Teachers of Arabic =

Professional society in the United States

The American Association of Teachers of Arabic (AATA) is a professional society that promotes the study of Arabic and Arabic literature in the United States. It was founded in 1963 under the auspices of the Modern Language Association and is affiliated with the American Council on the Teaching of Foreign Languages and the Middle East Studies Association. Its current president is Dris Soulaimani of San Diego State University. It publishes an annual academic journal, Al-ʿArabiyya, and formerly published a newsletter, An-Nashra.

== History ==
Although Arabic was taught in the United States from at least the late 17th century, it gained strategic importance during and after World War II. In 1957, the Social Science Research Council and the Ford Foundation initiated a program to improve the teaching of Arabic in universities. One outcome of this program was a series of meetings of Arabic teachers who, in 1963, formed the AATA with the sponsorship of the Modern Language Association. Shortly thereafter it also became affiliated with the American Council on the Teaching of Foreign Languages and the Middle East Studies Association.

The AATA organized regular meetings throughout the 1960s and 1970s, which resulted in the publication of a series of cirricula, an elementary textbook, and a standardized proficiency test. Materials produced by the AATA emphasized the teaching of Arabic as a living modern language, in contrast to pedagogical approaches before World War II, when Arabic was mainly taught in a historical, philological or theological context. In 2003, it published a document outlining 'professional standards for teachers of Arabic'.

The AATA had around a hundred members in 1971 and 130 in 2006.

== Al-'Arabiyya ==
Al-'Arabiyya
- Discipline: Arabic Linguistics
- Language: English
- Edited by: Mohammad T. Alhawary

Publication details
- Former name: An-Nashra
- History: 1967–present
- Publisher: Georgetown University Press on behalf of the American Association of Teachers of Arabic (United States)
- Frequency: Annual
- Impact factor: 0.1 (2022)

Standard abbreviations
- ISO 4: Al-ʿArabiyya

Indexing
- ISSN: 0889-8731 (print); 2375-4036 (web)
- LCCN: 81641155
- JSTOR: 08898731
- OCLC no.: 958711182
- An-Nashra
- ISSN: 2378-0487 (print); 2378-0495 (web)

Links
- Journal homepage; Online access at Project MUSE

Al-'Arabiyya (also typeset as Al-ʻArabiyya, transliterated as Al-ʕArabiyya) is an annual peer-reviewed academic journal published by Georgetown University Press on behalf of the association. It was established in 1967 as An-Nashra, obtaining its current title in 1975, and covers "the study, research, and teaching of Arabic language, linguistics, literature, and pedagogy". The editor-in-chief is Mohammad T. Alhawary of the University of Michigan.

The journal is abstracted and indexed in:

- Emerging Sources Citation Index
- Index Islamicus
- Linguistic Bibliography
- Linguistics & Language Behavior Abstracts
- Modern Language Association Database
- Scopus (2019–2021)

According to the Journal Citation Reports, the journal has a 2022 impact factor of 0.1.
