= Al-Aadaissah =

Al-Aadaissah العديسة
- Municipality
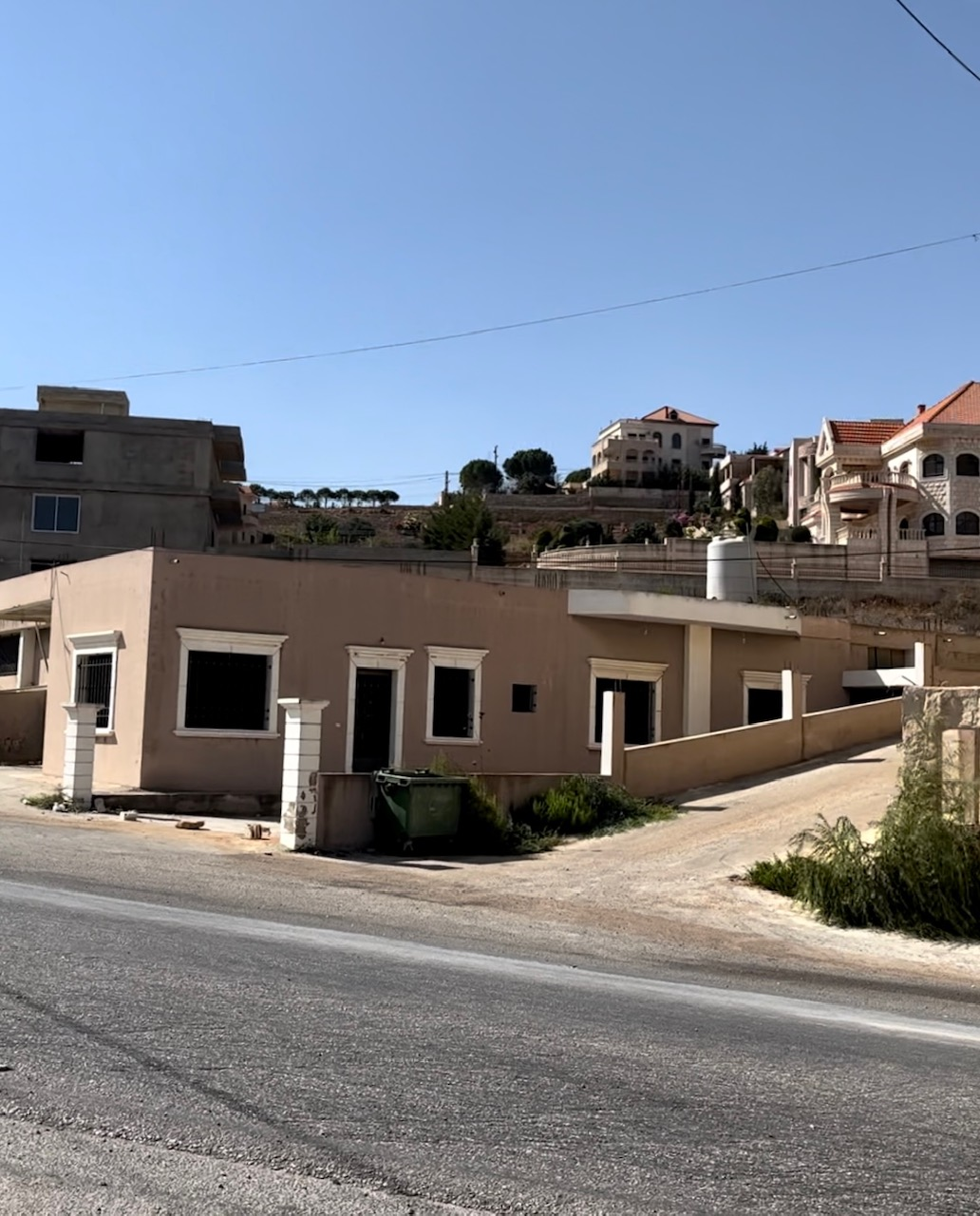
- Al-Aadaissah

- Location within Lebanon
- Coordinates: 33°15′15″N 35°32′33″E
- Grid position: 201/295 PAL
- Country: Lebanon
- Governorate: Nabatieh Governorate
- District: Marjayoun District
- Elevation: 700 m (2,300 ft)
- Time zone: UTC+2 (EET)
  - Summer (DST): UTC+3 (EEST)
- Dialing code: +961
- Website: https://odaisseh.com/

Al-Aadaissah or Odaisseh (Arabic: العديسة / BGN: Aadaïssé / ISO 233: Al `Udaysah; also Adaisseh, Adessé, Odeissé, Odeissah and other spellings) is a municipality in south Lebanon. It is located close to the Blue Line border with Israel, opposite the Israeli kibbutz of Misgav Am. The majority of its population are Shia Muslims.

== Etymology ==
According to E. H. Palmer, the name Odeithat et Tahta means "the lower ’Odeitha".

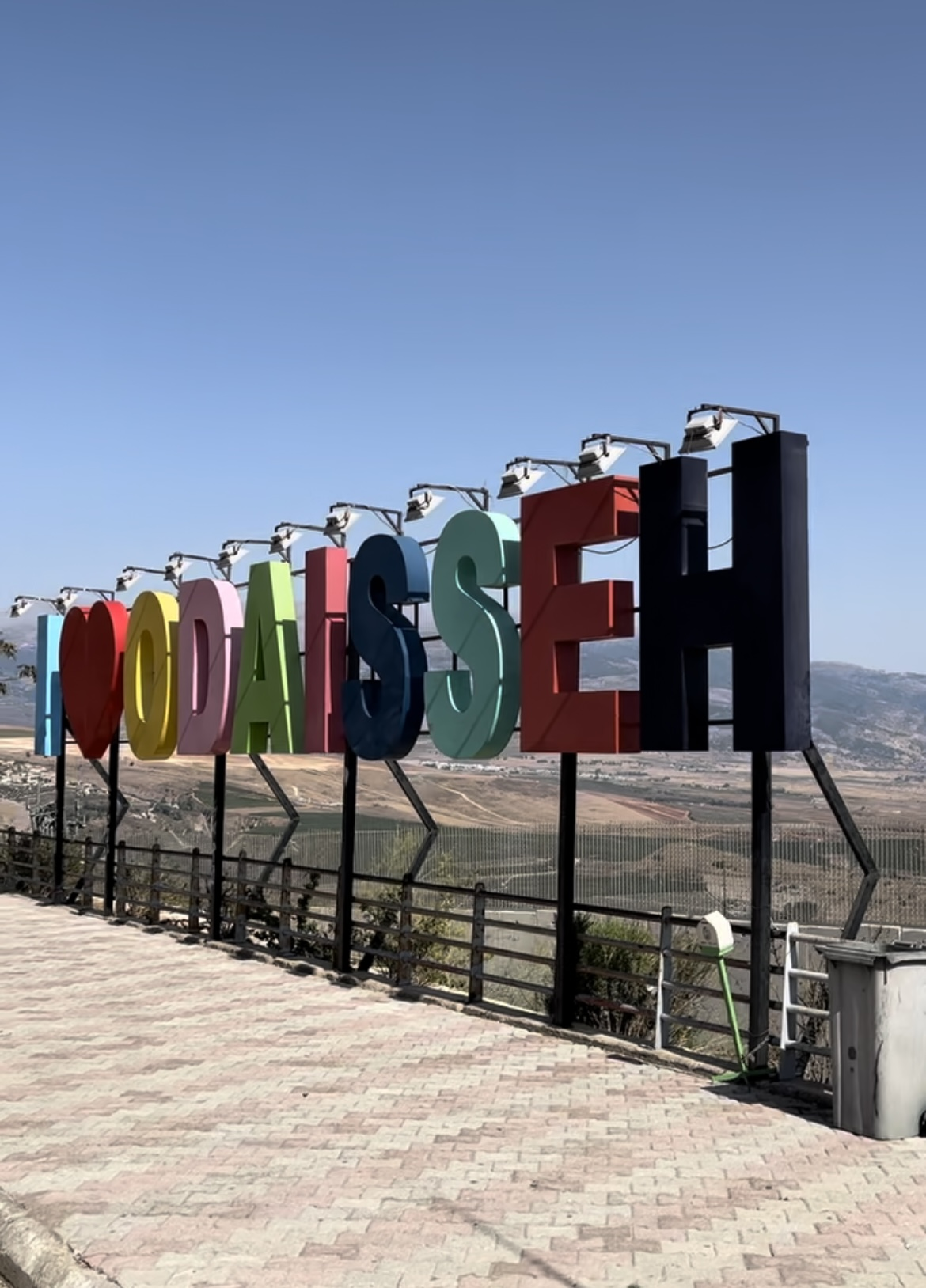
Sign in Odaisseh, overlooking Israel

== History ==
=== Ottoman period ===
Just north of Al-Aadaissah is a place formerly called 'Odeitha el Foka. In 1875, Victor Guérin described it as "an elevated plateau crowned with the ruins of a small fort of rectangular form, measuring forty paces long by thirty broad. It is in rubble work, with an external casing of regular stones of small size, and is divided in the interior into several compartments." In 1881, the PEF's Survey of Western Palestine (SWP) found here: "A ruined Saracenic building with one cistern."

In 1881, SWP found at the village (which it called Odeitha et Tahtâ) "cisterns and several lintels." It further described it as "A village, built of stone, containing about 250 Metawileh, situated in valley surrounded by arable land. A market is held here one day each week. Water supply from spring in village, spring near, and several cisterns."

=== 21st century ===
The village was the site of the 2010 Lebanon–Israeli border clash, when Israeli and Lebanese forces engaged in cross-border combat.

Hezbollah's participation in the Gaza war (2023–2025), backing Hamas and initiating attacks on Israel, escalated the border zone into an active war zone characterized by frequent cross-border attacks. As a result, almost all of the village's residents have left.

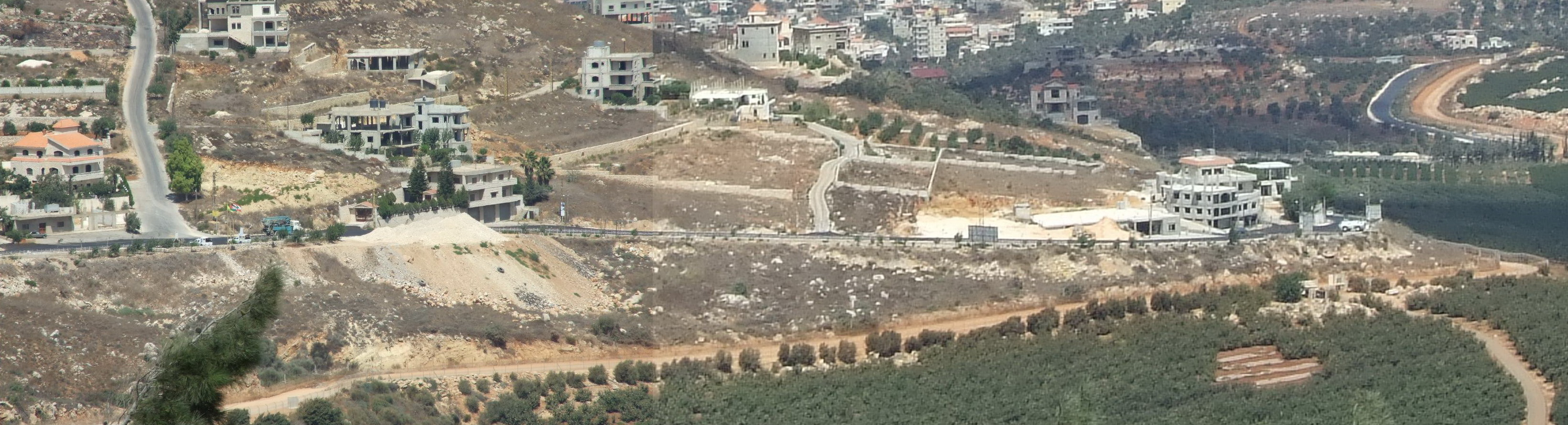
The Lebanese village of Al-Aadaissah as seen from Israel

On the 21–23 October 2024, a number of buildings in Al-Aadaissah were demolished by the Israeli military, among them a cultural centre and the family home of Lubnan Baalbaki, the conductor of Lebanon's philharmonic orchestra. The centre was full of his father's, the artist Abdel-Hamid Baalbaki (ar), collection of fine art and pottery, in addition to 2,000 manuscripts and books.

Al-Aadaissah had observation and various missile lunchers posts situated around the village and its countryside from which several attacks were carried out on the nearby, lower, Israeli civilian settlements.

According to Israeli reports, Odaisseh was supposed to be the jump-off point for Hezbollah's conquest of Misgav Am by a company of the Redwan Force. The IDF found crates of rockets, anti-tank guided missiles, explosives, and RPGs inside residential buildings.

== Demographics ==
In 2014 Muslims made up 99.28% of registered voters in Al-Aadaissah. 97.12% of the voters were Shiite Muslims.

== Notable people ==
- Hussein Amine (born 1985), Lebanese footballer
- Hussein Monzer (born 1997), Lebanese footballer

== Bibliography ==
- Conder, C.R.; Kitchener, H.H. (1881). The Survey of Western Palestine: Memoirs of the Topography, Orography, Hydrography, and Archaeology. Vol. 1. London: Committee of the Palestine Exploration Fund.
- Guérin, V. (1880). Description Géographique Historique et Archéologique de la Palestine (in French). Vol. 3: Galilee, pt. 2. Paris: L'Imprimerie Nationale.
- Palmer, E.H. (1881). The Survey of Western Palestine: Arabic and English Name Lists Collected During the Survey by Lieutenants Conder and Kitchener, R. E. Transliterated and Explained by E.H. Palmer. Committee of the Palestine Exploration Fund.
