= Algeria Press Service =

International news agency headquartered in Algiers

- Company type: Établissement public à caractère industriel et commercial (EPIC)
- Industry: News agency
- Founded: December 1, 1961; 64 years ago in Tunis, Tunisia
- Headquarters: Bouadou Brothers Avenue, Bir Mourad Rais, Algiers, Algeria
- Area served: Worldwide
- Products: News
- Owner: Government of Algeria
- Number of employees: 460
- Divisions: See complete list
- Algeria Press Service
- Available in: Arabic; French
- Commercial: No
- Registration: Optional
- Current status: Available
- Website: www.aps.dz

Algeria Press Service (APS; Arabic: وكالة الأنباء الجزائرية (وأج), romanized: Wakālat al-’Anbā’ al-Jazā’iriyyah (WĀJ), Tamazight: Tanegga n Yisalan n Dzayer, French: Algérie Presse Service) is the state news agency of Algeria. It is a member of the Federation of Arab News Agencies.

In 2023, APS added a Russian-language information service, expanding its broadcast languages from the existing five (Arabic, Tamazight in three scripts, French, English, Spanish) to six. A Chinese service is reportedly in development. APS is subordonated to the dépendant du ministère de l’Information of Algeria. Director General of APS is Samir Gaid.

== History ==
Algeria Press Service was created on December 1, 1961 in Tunis, in the wake of the Algerian War of Independence to be the flagship of the Algerian Revolution and the nation's standard-bearer on the global media scene. As a strong supporter of the November 1954 Revolution, APS settled soon after the cease-fire at the historic Casbah of Algiers, the centre of the resistance during the war. The agency was preparing for the post-war period, i.e. reconstruction of the country, and consolidation of national sovereignty.

Following independence, APS headquarters temporarily settled in a maisonette at Krim Belkacem Boulevard in Algiers, improving its editorial office. They began establishing their network throughout the country and acquiring their first technical equipment. With it, the agency began operating as a public service broadcasting network. In the meantime, it started training journalists, technicians and operators.

On April 1, 1963, the agency, which moved to a building at Che Guevara Boulevard where it stayed for over thirty years, began telegraphic news broadcasting. It got connected with other world news agencies. It also extended its network of regional bureaus and invested in its representations abroad. Its expanding photography service at the time enabled APS to distribute images of Algeria's broad reconstruction process, using the Belino System.

On November 19, 1985, APS became an Établissement public à caractère économique et à vocation socio-culturelle. (Note: It means: "Public Institution with Economic missions, endowed with Social and Cultural dimensions".) Transformed on April 20, 1991 into an Établissement public à caractère industriel et commercial (EPIC). (Note: It means "Public Company with Economic and Commercial aspect".) In January 1993, the agency moved to its new headquarters in Kouba. It became involved in new technologies on January 1, 1994, when it launched its first computerised editorial office. On April 25, 1995, it started delivering its news automatically.

On February 18, 1998, APS inaugurated its official website, having been hosted the previous year by the Research Center in Scientific and Technical Information (CERIST). On July 5, 1998, both of the agency's pages in Arabic and the agency's online product, APS Online, were launched. This marked the starting-point of a new stage that would position the agency among the world leaders of news and communication. In November of the same year, it launched its broadcast via satellite, which would help the agency diversify its service range.

Starting January 1, 2009, APS covers all the Algerian territory.

== Visual identity (logo) ==
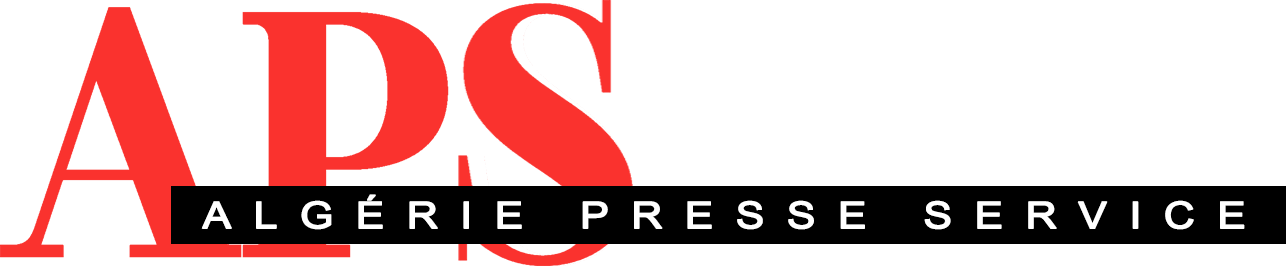
Logo of the Algeria Press Service in 1961.

Current English logo of the Algeria Press Service (2023)

== Divisions ==
=== Regional directorates ===
At the regional level, the news is collected by a network of correspondents gathered around 4 regional directorates and covering all the country:

Regional directorate	Based in	Affiliated cities
Central Regional Management	Blida	Tipaza, Boumerdès, Tizi Ouzou, Béjaïa, Bouira, Djelfa, Aïn Defla and Médéa
Eastern Regional Directorate	Constantine	Batna, Annaba, Skikda, Jijel, Oum El Bouaghi, Tébessa, Souk Ahras, El Taref, Mila, Khenchela, Biskra, Guelma, Sétif, M'Sila and Bordj Bou Arréridj
Western Regional Directorate	Oran	Tlemcen, Saïda, Sidi Bel Abbès, Mostaganem, Tiaret, Tissemsilt, Aïn Témouchent, Relizane, Mascara and Chlef
Southern Regional Directorate	Ouargla	Adrar, Tamanrasset, Illizi, Tindouf, Naâma, Laghouat, Béchar, Ghardaïa, El Oued and El Bayadh
Overseas	Algiers	Washington, Moscow, Paris, London, Brussels, Rome, Madrid, Cairo, Rabat, Tunis, Amman and Dakar

== See also ==
- Federation of Arab News Agencies (FANA)
