= Sadoun =

Sadoun is a masculine given name and surname of Arabic origin. Notable people with the name include:

== Given name ==
- Sadoun al-Zubaydi (born 1950), English literature professor
- Sadoun Salman (born 1977), Kuwaiti footballer

== Surname ==
- Arthur Sadoun (born 1971), French businessman, chairman and CEO of Publicis
- Medi Sadoun (born 1973), French actor
