= Anadolu Agency =

State-run news agency in Turkey

Anadolu Agency Anadolu Ajansı
- Type: Joint-stock company
- Industry: News agency
- Founded: 6 April 1920; 106 years ago
- Founders: Mustafa Kemal Pasha; Halide Edib; Yunus Nadi Abalıoğlu
- Headquarters: Çankaya, Ankara, Turkey
- Key people: Serdar Karagöz (Director-General, Chairman of the Board)
- Number of employees: 3,800
- Website: aa.com.tr

Anadolu Agency (Turkish: Anadolu Ajansı, lit. 'Anatolia Agency'; abbreviated AA) is a state-run news agency headquartered in Ankara, Turkey. It operates in 13 languages in over 100 countries.

== History ==
The Anadolu Agency was founded in 1920 during the Turkish War of Independence by the order of Mustafa Kemal Pasha. As the Ottoman Empire's capital, Constantinople, was under the Ottoman sultans' control, all newspapers were also under the sultan's rule along with British occupiers, and it was necessary for the revolutionary government to establish a communication and news network for Anatolia and Rumelia. Journalist Yunus Nadi Abalıoğlu and writer Halide Edip, fleeing the occupied capital, met in Geyve and concluded that a new Turkish press agency was needed. The agency was officially launched on April 6, 1920, 17 days before the Turkish Grand National Assembly convened for the first time. It announced the first legislation passed by the Assembly, which established the Republic of Turkey. In 1925, an act of parliament declared it an autonomous agency, but it continued to serve as a "quasi-governmental entity".

After the Justice and Development Party (AKP) took power, AA and the Turkish Radio and Television Corporation (TRT) were both restructured to more closely reflect the administration line. According to a 2016 academic article, "these public news producers, especially during the most recent term of the AKP government, have been controlled by officials from a small network close to the party leadership."

== Influence ==
According to the former general director of AA, Kemal Öztürk, it has the largest broadcaster of Arabic news in the Middle East and produces 70 percent of all news content in Turkey. Political scholar Oğuz Güner says that "AA conveys the vision of Turkish foreign policy, Türkiye's viewpoint towards the world, and Turkish culture and history to the international community."

Anadolu Agency is an active member of the European Alliance of News Agencies (EANA). Since 1978, AA has been a member of the Organization of Asia-Pacific News Agencies (OANA).

== See also ==
- Mass media in Turkey
- List of news agencies
