= Kuwait News Agency =

Official state news wire service in Kuwait

Coordinates: 29°20′37″N 47°56′52″E

Kuwait News Agency KUNA
- وكالة الأنباء الكويتية كونا

Agency overview
- Formed: 1956; 70 years ago
- Headquarters: Shuwaikh, Al Asimah, Kuwait
- Agency executives: Mubarak Al Duaij Al Sabah, Chairman; Ahmad Yusuf Behbehani, Deputy Chairman; Ahmad Husain GH. Dashti
- Parent ministry: Ministry of Information
- Website: www.kuna.net.kw

Kuwait News Agency (KUNA; Arabic: وكالة الأنباء الكويتية, romanized: Wikālat al-Anbāʾ al-Kuwayitiyya, abbr. كونا) is an official state news wire service based in Kuwait.

== History and structure ==
KUNA was established in 1956. It was reorganized in 1976 as an independent body, functioning in practice as a branch of the Ministry of Information, although it has an independent budget.

The agency has a section with the title of Health and Environment which covers regularly updated news on environmental issues.

As of 2009, the news agency had offices and correspondents in 33 countries.

KUNA is an active member of the Federation of Arab News Agencies (FANA) that includes the national news agencies of 18 Arab countries.

=== Incidents ===
During Iraq's invasion of Kuwait, KUNA relocated its main office to London (October 1990) and following the liberation of the country, the agency resumed transmission from Kuwait on 15 November 1991.

== See also ==
- Federation of Arab News Agencies (FANA)
