= Misgav Am =

Misgav Am: משגב עם (Hebrew)
- Kibbutz
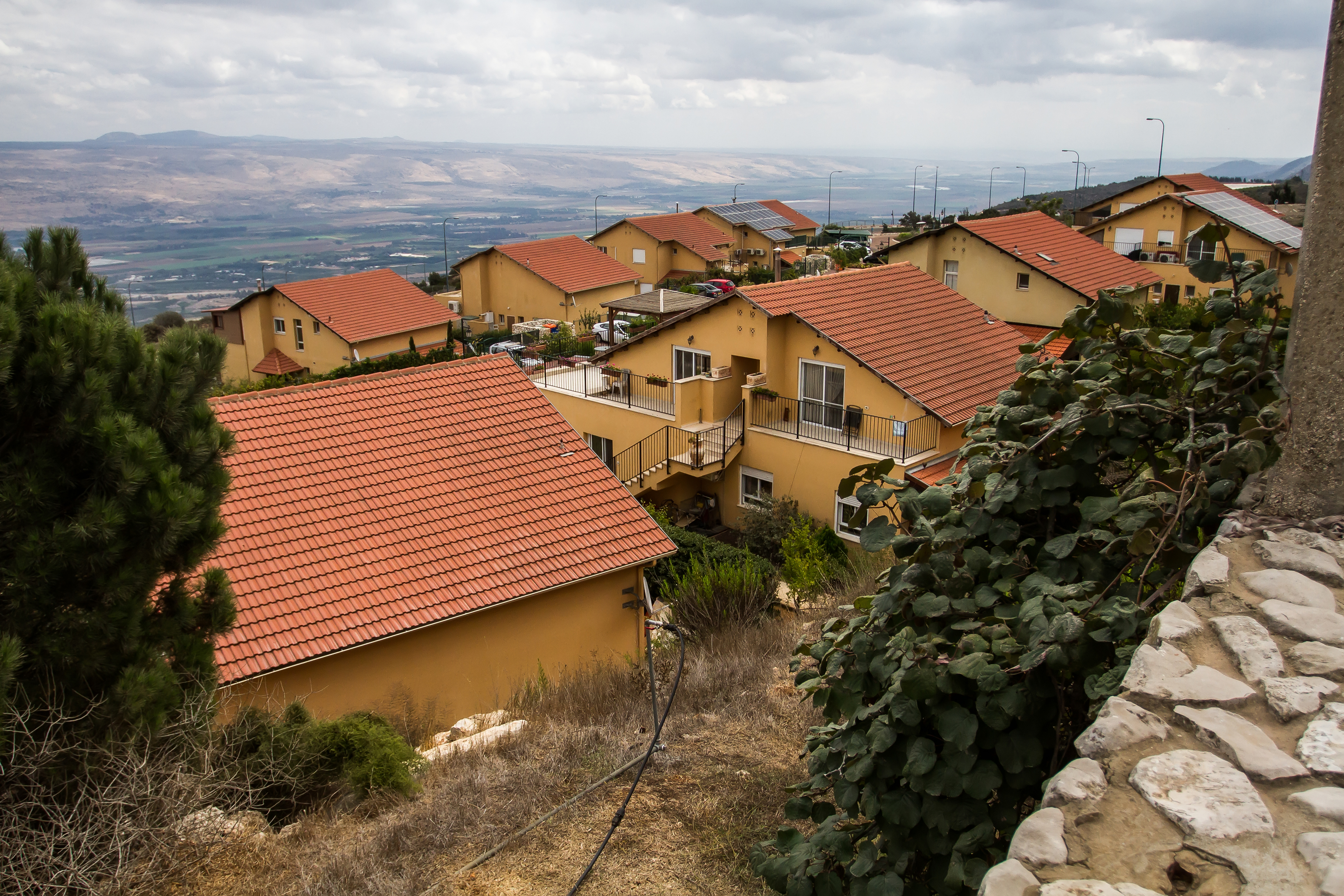

- Location within Northeast Israel
- Coordinates: 33°14′52″N 35°32′54″E
- Country: Israel
- District: Northern
- Subdistrict: Safed
- Council: Upper Galilee
- Affiliation: Kibbutz Movement
- Founded: 2 November 1945
- Founder: Hanoar Haoved members
- Population (2024): 401
- Website: www.misgav-am.com

Misgav Am (Hebrew: משגב עם, lit. 'Fortress of the People') is a kibbutz in the Upper Galilee in northern Israel. Located close to the border with Lebanon, facing the Lebanese town of Odaisseh, and near the Israeli town of Kiryat Shmona, it falls under the jurisdiction of Upper Galilee Regional Council. In 2024 it had a population of 401.

Misgav Am is 840 metres (2,760 ft) above sea level and overlooks on one side the Hula Valley and on the other side the neighboring Lebanese village of Odaisseh.

== History ==
The kibbutz was founded on 2 November 1945, the anniversary of the Balfour Declaration, by young Palmach members. Misgav Am was one of seven Palmach posts established on the eastern fringe of the Galilee. It was located near the now depopulated Palestinian village of Hunin.

The founders were members of Hanoar Haoved from the suburbs of Tel Aviv. They were later joined by new immigrants from Turkey and Bulgaria.

In the late 1970s, the population increased as new immigrants moved there from Europe, the United States and South America.

On 7 April 1980, five armed men from the Iraqi-backed Arab Liberation Front penetrated Misgav Am in the night and entered the nursery. They killed the kibbutz secretary and an infant boy and held the rest of the children hostage, demanding the release of about 50 captives held in Israeli prisons. The first raid of an IDF infantry unit was unsuccessful, but a second attempt, a few hours later, succeeded, and all the armed group were killed. Two kibbutz members and one soldier were killed, four children and 11 soldiers were wounded.

Immediately after the attack, Israeli troops entered southern Lebanon and to intensify the pressure on the Palestinian in Lebanon. Israel withdrew after five days, because of heavy political pressure by the United States, and the losses due to years of fighting with the differents Lebanese factions. In the years of the Israeli occupation of Southern Lebanon (1982–2000), the kibbutz had cordial relations with the people on the other side of the border, despite the state of war between Lebanon and Israel since 1948.

During the Second Lebanon war in 2006, several thousands of IDF troops were deployed around Misgav Am, which brought heavy logistical problems regarding food, water and sanitary facilities.

=== 2023 war ===
During the Gaza war, northern Israeli border communities, including Misgav Am, faced targeted attacks by Hezbollah and Palestinian factions based in Lebanon, and were evacuated.

==== 2024 Israeli invasion of Lebanon ====
On 30 September 2024, the Israeli Defense Forces (IDF) launched a limited ground invasion into Southern Lebanon. On that same day, the IDF declared that Misgav Am became a closed military area.

=== 2026 war ===
On March 22, 2026, a direct strike hit a vehicle in Misgav Am, killing one resident during the fighting on Israel's northern border

== Education ==
The kibbutz offers an education system beginning age three and ending after high school. There is a daycare center for babies, another for infants and also a kindergarten. Elementary school is at kibbutz Kfar Giladi. Junior and senior high school is located at kibbutz Dafna.

With the new policy of a longer schooling day, children receive various enrichment classes in the region: dance and music at Kfar Blum, ice-skating at Canada centre of Metula, and karate at Ramot Naftali.

== Kibbutz life ==
Around 90 of the 300 people living in Misgav Am are members. Many residents study in the nearby Academic College of Tel Hai. The kibbutz residents celebrate some of the Jewish and national holidays together, which is kind of a kibbutz tradition: Lag Ba'omer, Independence Day, Hanukkah, Tu Bishvat and Shavuot.

The kibbutz has a covered swimming pool, a library, a mini-market and sports courts. Besides a 24-hour Magen David Adom emergency station, there is also a health clinic which belongs to Clalit Health Services.

== Economy ==
The kibbutz factory, Sion Texo Medic Ltd., produces bandages and wound dressings.

== Gallery ==
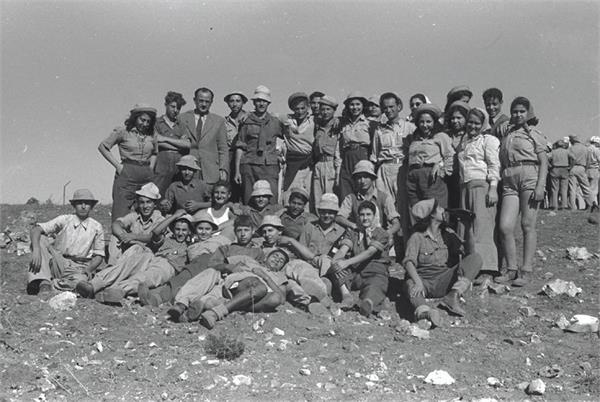
First residents 1945

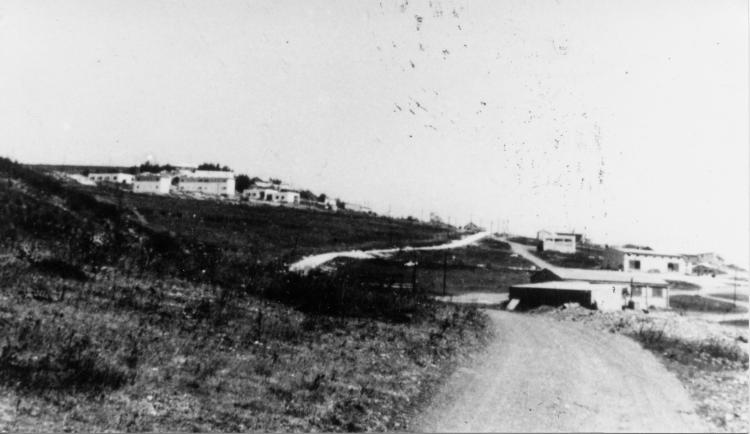
Kibbutz Misgave-Am (c. 1948)

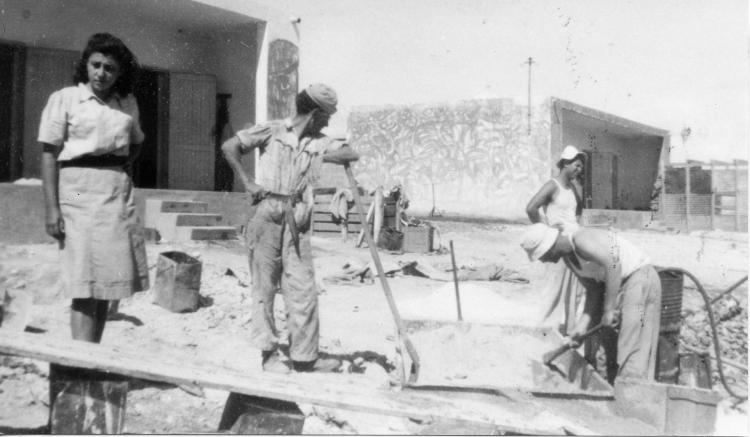
Yiftach Brigade carrying out construction work at Misgav Am (1948)

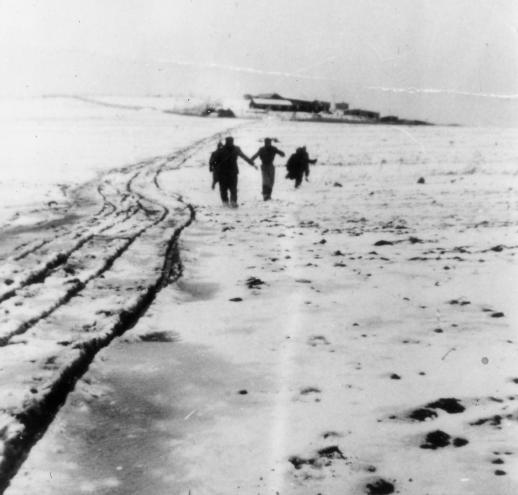
Winter 1948

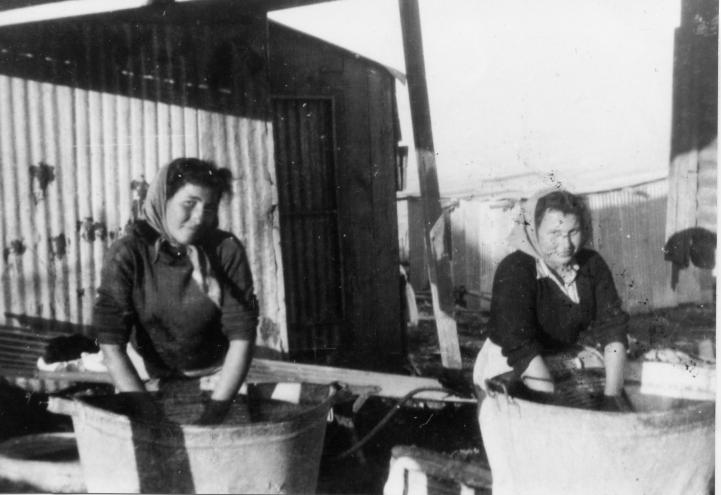
Laundry (1948)

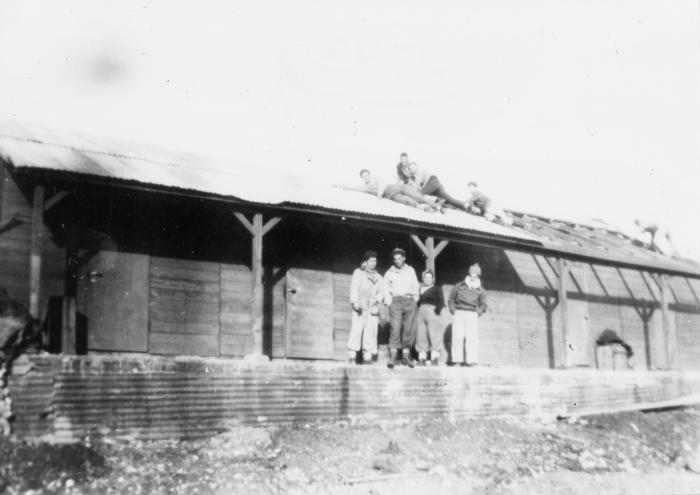
Repairing dining hall roof after storm damage (1948)
