= Nina Iraq =

Bilingual magazine

Nina Iraq is a bilingual magazine for Iraqi women everywhere, running articles mostly on women's empowerment themes. It is published a couple of times a year as a hard copy magazine, with digital publication and interaction on the Website as the live feed. Nina-Iraq is published by NGO the Private Sector Development Centre in Iraq (PSDC). with support from the World Bank Group for the first issue and ongoing support from Chamber Trade Sweden into 2015 and beyond. Nina-Iraq focusses on economic empowerment opportunities by showcasing real voices through interviews and stories in both English and Arabic. The printed magazine is fed by features from the Nina-Iraq website.

== History ==
Designed to create trade links and shared expertise in a digital Iraqi homeland, Nina aims to inspire collaboration by 5 million Iraqi diaspora with in country Iraqi's. The distribution of 20,000 magazines in Iraq and internationally occurs through private sector organisations and chambers of trade - as well as online interaction. Nina was created in response to calls to action such as co-founder Madeleine White's report on Women in the Private Sector in MENA.

=== Winter 2013 ===
Nina gets a name and a brand. Nina is one of the names of Goddess "Inana", representing fertility, beauty and love to the ancient people of Mesopotamia. The Goddess appeared for the first time in the lands of "Sumer" 5,000 years ago. She was symbolized in cuneiform writing by an octagon star that referred to the planet Venus. She also came to symbolize the desire of communication between man and woman; from her body, a new life arises. Nina is a shortening on Inana, can be pronounced used in English and Arabic and has no modern religious connotations, instead referencing Iraq's rich past.

=== Spring 2014 ===
In April Issue 1 was launched in London in the House of Commons by Lorely Burt MP, with support by ABCC Chair Baroness Symonds of Vernham Dean. In May Issue 1 was launched with Chamber Trade Sweden and the Swedish diaspora Stockholm.

=== Summer 2014 ===
The Iraqi launch took place at the Grand Millennium Hotel in Suleimania in early June with support from Asiacell. The incursion of Isis, meant focus on the online edition of Nina. Nina's poem was written in order to create a united vision for all the volunteers disheartened by the invasion of ISIS, who were worried about Nina's relevance and future.

== Features ==
Nina-Iraq's contributors are normal people, not journalists, although some special interviews are professionally done. For example, business opportunities around environmental sustainability, health and oil and gas are presented, offering industry for Iraq and Iraqi Kurdistan. Contributors can upload their stories directly via Share My Story, Email or work to get journalistic support via corporate volunteer portal, Benefacto. Examples include a call to action by 14-year-old Mariam, a Women in Islam story by finance expert Natalie Schoon and an interview with global Vital Voices Winner Suaad Allami. Microsoft's masr ta3mal education and Aspire Woman Mentoring platforms can be accessed directly. There is also a business register on Nina's Directory.

== Particular characteristics ==
All submitted features are translated into either Arabic or English, depending on submission language in order to create a shared cultural dialogue to a wider audience. By focusing so strongly on women, there is a question however, whether wider political and social issues are being sufficiently addressed through Nina. As a women's magazine it has also been confused with a lifestyle or beauty magazine.
