= Saba News Agency =

Official state news agency of Yemen

Saba News Agency (SABA) Yemen News Agency
- سبأ وكالة الأنباء اليمنية

Agency overview
- Formed: 16 November 1970; 55 years ago
- Headquarters: Sana'a, Yemen
- Website: https://www.saba.ye/en (Houthi) http://www.sabanew.net/ (Alimi)

The Saba News Agency (Arabic: سبأ), also known as the Yemen News Agency (Arabic: وكالة الأنباء اليمنية), is the official state news agency of Yemen.

== History and profile ==
SABA was founded on 16 November 1970 as the official news agency of North Yemen, and is headquartered in the capital Sana'a. On 22 May 1990, the agency was merged with the Aden News Agency (ANA) of South Yemen to create the Yemen News Agency Saba. The agency provides news on the Middle East and region.

It is a member of the Federation of Arab News Agencies (FANA).

== Yemeni Civil War ==
On 19 January 2015, the Houthis seized the agency. The agency then split into two factions: one pro-Hadi/Alimi, the other pro-Houthi.

After 6 June 2021, forces of the separatist Southern Transitional Council stormed the SABA building in Aden. The rebels were reported to have closed down the building with death threats to the employees.

== See also ==
- Communications in Yemen
- Media of Yemen
- Federation of Arab News Agencies (FANA)
