= Inter Press Service =

Global news agency headquartered in Rome, Italy

The Inter Press Service
- Company type: Not-for-profit cooperative
- Industry: News media
- Founded: 1965
- Area served: Worldwide
- Services: Wire service
- Website: www.ips.org (organization); www.ipsnews.net (news)

Inter Press Service (IPS) is a global news agency headquartered in Rome, Italy. Its main focus is news and analysis about social, political, civil, and economic subjects as they relate to the Global South, civil society, and globalization.

== History ==
IPS was set up in 1964 as a non-profit international journalist cooperative. Its founders were the Italian journalist Roberto Savio and Argentine political scientist Pablo Piacentini. Initially, the primary objective was to fill the information gap between Europe and Latin America after the political turbulence following the Cuban Revolution of 1959.

Later the network expanded to include all continents, from its Latin American base in Costa Rica in 1982. In 1994, IPS changed its legal status to that of a public-benefit organization for development cooperation

In 1996, IPS had permanent offices and correspondents in 41 countries, covering 108 nations. Its subscribers included over 600 print media, around 80 news agencies and database services, and 65 broadcast media, in addition to over 500 NGOs and other institutions.

== Approach ==
IPS's stated aims are to present voices of marginalized and vulnerable people and groups, to report from the perspectives of developing countries, and to reflect the views of civil society. The mainstreaming of gender in reporting and the assessment of the impacts of globalization are priorities.

IPS may be unique in its concentration on developing countries and its strong relationships with civil society. For this reason, IPS has been termed by some probably the "largest and most credible of all 'alternatives' in the world of news agencies." It is also considered by some as the "first and only independent and professional news agency which provides on daily basis information with a Third World focus and point of view."

== Legal status ==
IPS is registered as an international not-for-profit association. It has "general" NGO consultative status with ECOSOC at the United Nations, and the OECD status of "ODA eligible international organization".

== Organizational structure ==
Five editorial desks coordinate the project: Montevideo, (regional bureau for Latin America); Berlin-London (for Europe and the Mediterranean); Bangkok (for Asia and the Pacific); New York City (North America and the Caribbean) and Johannesburg (Africa). Most of IPS's journalists and editors are native to the country or region in which they work.

IPS receives funding from various sources: through its subscribers and clients, from multilateral and national development cooperation programmes, and project financing from foundations. It is not, as are most other agencies, financed by a country or newspaper group. The agency's budget is comparatively small for "roughly the sixth-largest international news-gathering organization".

== Role ==
IPS's role is to provide an alternative to sometimes non-existent or unaffordable clipping services.

One study by the UN's Food and Agriculture Organization in 1991 found that of the nearly 3,000 clippings with news agency bylines, 13% credited IPS, making it the third-most cited. IPS reports were collected from 138 publications in 39 countries, more countries than any other agency. IPS was particularly strong in Latin America; 72% of clippings from Latin America with news agency bylines came from IPS.

== Notable contributors ==
- Jim Lobe
- Fitzroy Nation
- Mohammed Omer
- Gareth Porter
- Don Gasangwa
- Mario Lubetkin

== See also ==
- New World Information Order
- Non-Aligned News Agencies Pool
- Non-Aligned News Network
- Languages Dilema
- Wikidoc IPS
