= St. Mark's Church, Zagreb =

Church of St. Mark (Croatian: Crkva sv. Marka)
- Župa Svetog Marka Evanđeliste
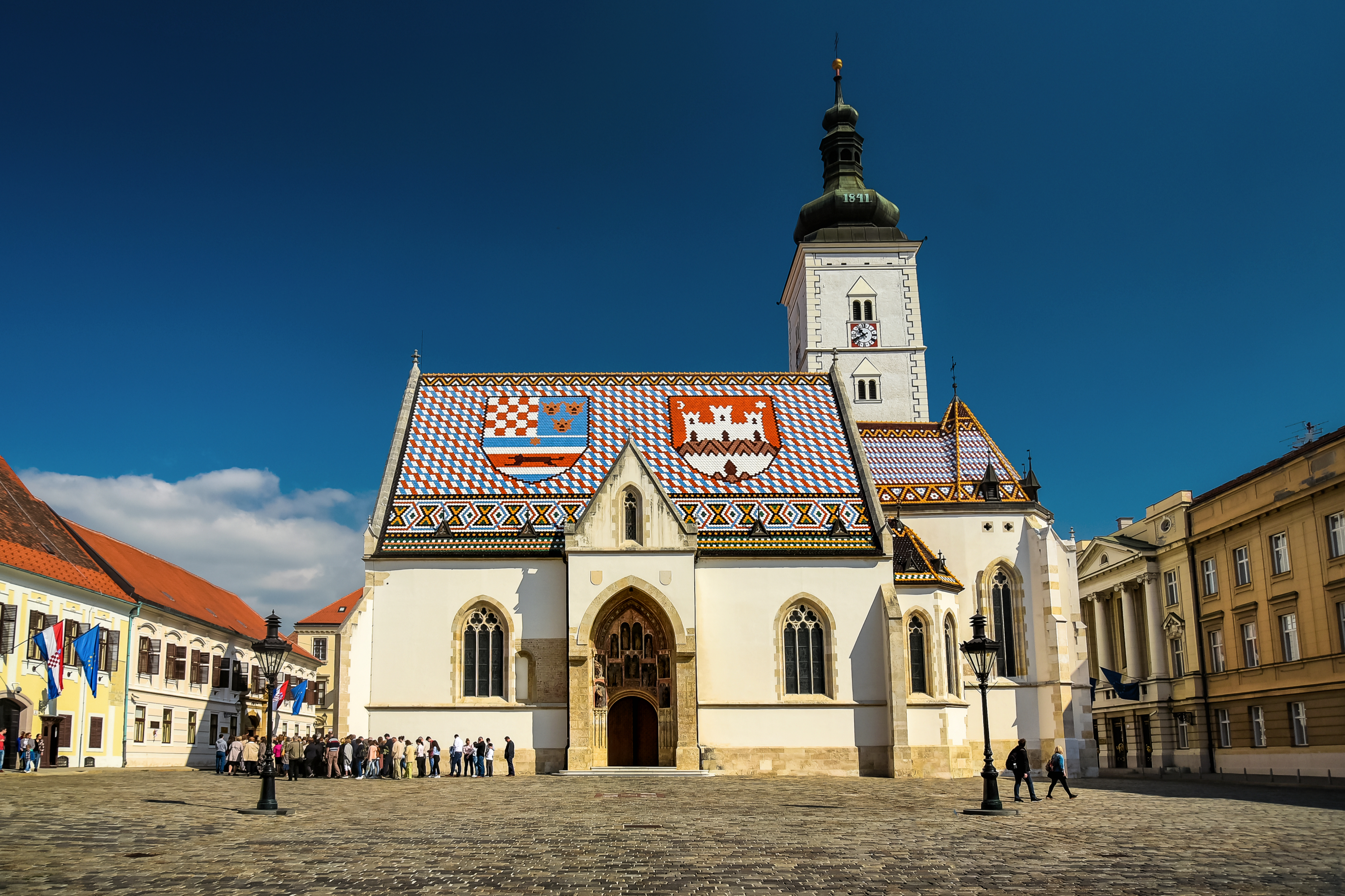
- Facade of the church
- Church of St. Mark (Croatian: Crkva sv. Marka)
- 45°48′59″N 15°58′26″E
- Location: St. Mark's Square, Upper Town, Zagreb
- Country: Croatia
- Denomination: Roman Catholic
- Website: https://zupa-svmarkaev.hr/

History
- Status: Parish church
- Founded: 13th century
- Dedication: St. Mark Evangelist
- Events: Radically reconstructed in the second half of the 14th century

Architecture
- Functional status: Active
- Style: Late Gothic with some Romanesque features
- Completed: 13th century

Specifications
- Length: 35 m
- Width: 16 m

Cultural Good of Croatia
- Type: Protected cultural good
- Reference no.: Z-182

The Church of St. Mark (Croatian: Crkva sv. Marka, pronounced [tsr̩kʋa sʋetoɡ mar̩ka]) is the parish church of old Zagreb, located in St. Mark's Square in the Upper Town. It is one of the oldest architectural monuments in Zagreb. The most distinctive feature of the church is its medieval architecture and the colorful tiled roof featuring the coat of arms of Croatia, Dalmatia, and Slavonia, as well as the emblem of the city of Zagreb. The church has been a symbol of the city's rich history, and its origins date back to the 13th century. Due to its gothic and romanesque architecture, it's registered under Cultural Goods of Croatia.

== Overview ==
The Romanesque window found in its south facade is the best evidence that the church must have been built as early as the 13th century as is also the semicircular ground-plan of St. Mary's chapel (later altered).

In the second half of the 14th century, the church was radically reconstructed. It was then turned into a late Gothic church of the three-nave type.

Massive round columns support heavy ribbed vaults cut in stone and an air of peace and sublimity characterizes the church interior in its simplicity. The most valuable part of St. Mark's Church is its south portal, considered to be the work of sculptors of the Parler family from Prague (end of the 14th century).

The Gothic composition of the portal consists of fifteen effigies placed in eleven shallow niches. On top are the statues of Joseph and Mary with the infant Jesus, and below them one can see St. Mark and the Lion; the Twelve Apostles are placed on both sides of the portal (four wooden statues replaced the original ones which had been destroyed). In its artistic composition and the number of statues, this portal is the richest and the most valuable Gothic portal in southern Central Europe.

Outside, on the northwest wall of the church lies the oldest coat of arms of Zagreb with the year 1499 engraved in it (the original is kept in the Zagreb City Museum).

On the roof, tiles are laid so that they represent the coat of arms of Zagreb (white castle on red background) and Triune Kingdom of Croatia, Slavonia and Dalmatia.

As the corner of St. Mark's Square and the present day Street of Ćiril and Metod, was a Town Hall, the seat of the city administration in medieval times. The building has gone through a number of alteration and reconstruction phases, and today this old Town Hall still keeps its doors open for the meetings of the Zagreb City Council.

== History ==
=== Chronology of historical events ===
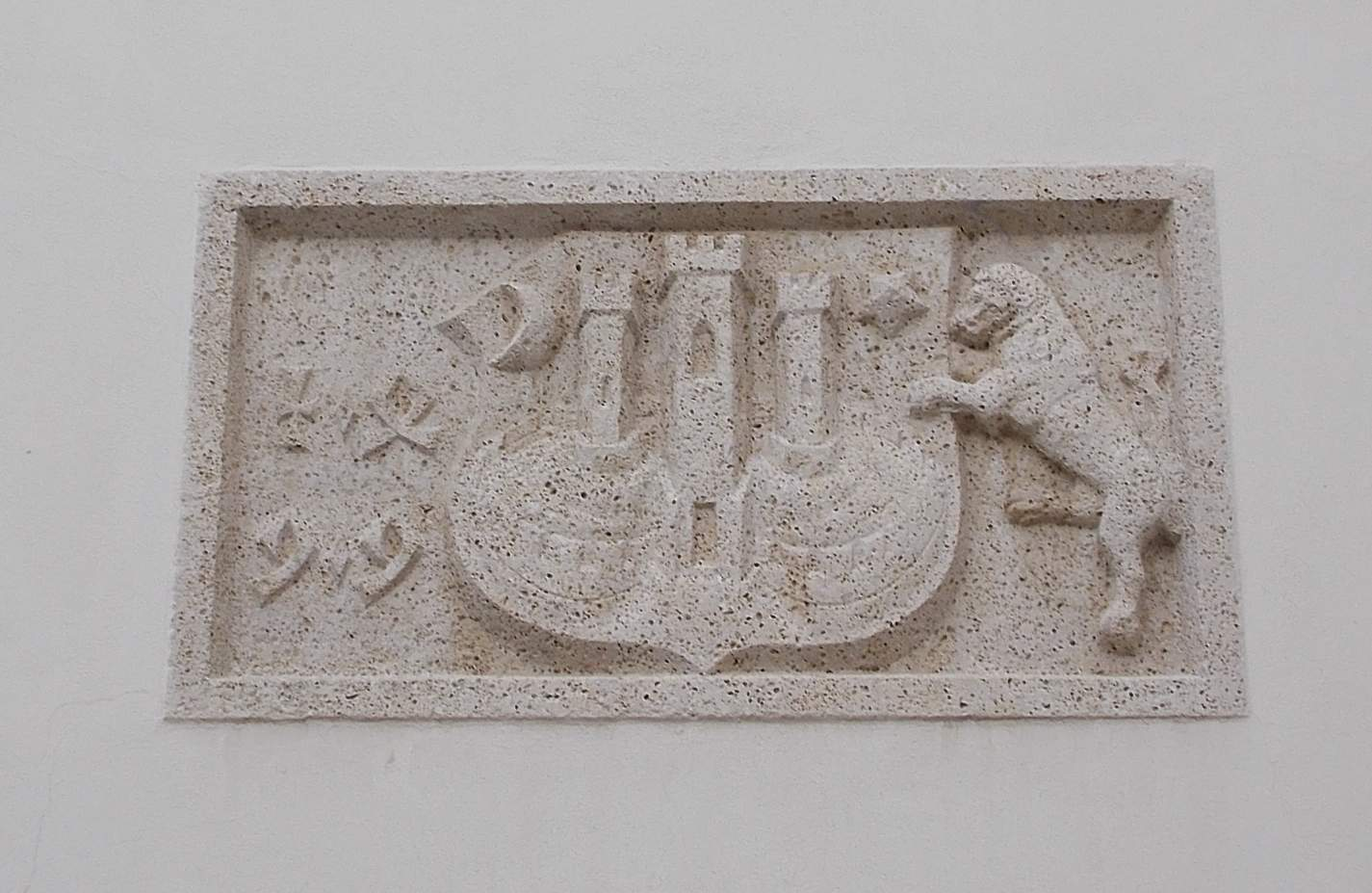
The oldest coat of arms of Zagreb

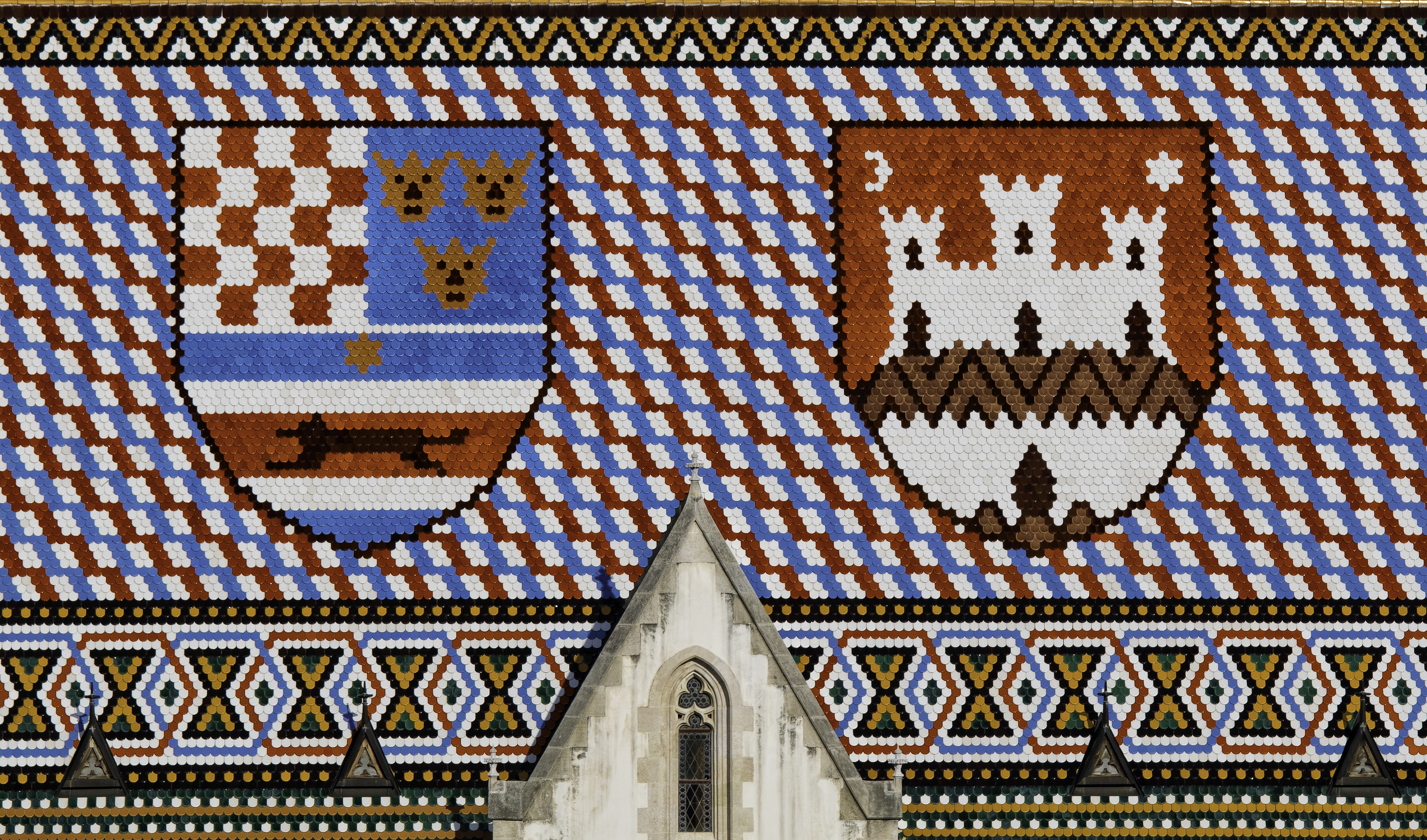
Polychrome roof tiles with the coats of arms of the Kingdom of Croatia, Dalmatia and Slavonia and Coat of arms of Zagreb

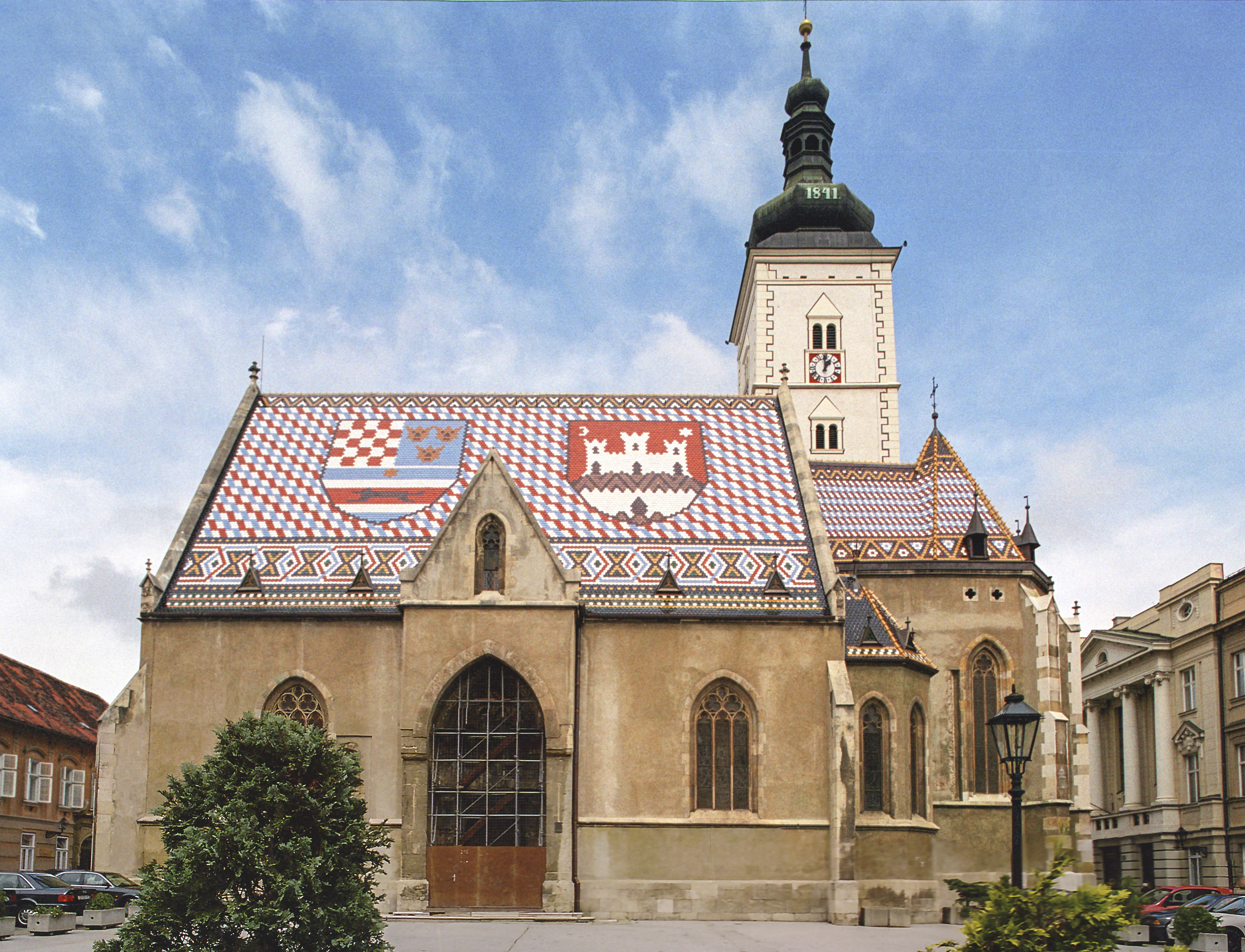
Church before 2006 renovations

- In 1256, the city municipality of Gradec received the right to hold Mark's annual fair, so it follows that there was already a church then. Church of St. Mark is located in the middle of the square, from which the streets are properly separated, so it can be seen that the city was founded according to the plan – all at once. (A. Horvat).
- In 1261, Queen Maria decreed, with the consent of Bishop Filip, that the patronage of the church should be given to the city, not the bishop.
- In 1334, "Item ecclesia sancti Marci in castro Grecensi" is mentioned, i.e. in the fortified settlement of Gradec.
- In 1359, the organist of the church of St. Mark, which shows that the church of St. Marka had an organ, which was befitting a royal city (L. Šaban). It is the first mention of an organ in Croatia.
- In 1423, during the time of pastor Blaž, the church got its present form.
- In 1472, it is mentioned on the northwest corner of the chapel church.
- In 1499, it was demolished and a new one was built, for advocates against the plague of St. Fabijan and Sebastljan. On it was the oldest preserved stone coat of arms of the City from 1409.
- In 1502, an earthquake toppled the bell tower located next to the sacristy.
- In 1588, a clock was placed on the new belfry.
- In 1645, the church was badly damaged in a fire, as well as in 1674 and 1707, together with the bells.
- In 1673, through a series of repairs, the church gradually changed its appearance in the 17th and 18th centuries, when there were 8 altars in the church. The altars were removed in 1880. In front of the altar of St. The city judges with the representation and the Croatian bans assured the cross that they will strictly observe the laws. In a niche near that altar, the charters of Gradec were kept. Memories of the patrons of some altars are preserved by pictures on the windows (Mark, Luke, John the Baptist, Paul, Joseph and Mary). Some statues of thrown altars, among which there are works by local masters of the workshop of Zagreb bishop J. Branjug, found refuge in museums.
- In 1740, the Zagreb canon J. Rees acquired an organ with 22 registers, which means that, along with the organ of the Zagreb Cathedral, it was the largest in the country. In the same year, city senator Ivan Hyacintha erected a pillar of the Immaculate Mary in front of the church with a gilded image on a tall pillar and stone statues of St. Joseph, St. John of Nepomuk, St. Ivana ev. and St. John the Baptist at the foot. This work by Claudio Kentz was on the square until 1869.
- In 1771, the idea of demolishing the church arose because it was too narrow, and it was proposed that the parish church be the church of St. Catherine. Josip II saved the church from demolition, saying that it is a solidly built monument that must be preserved.
- In 1805, the city representatives again had the intention of demolishing the church, but Bishop Maksimilijan Vrhovac and learned parish priest Dr. J Karvančić resisted.
- In 1848, some again proposed the demolition of the church, but others were of the opinion that it should be thoroughly repaired.
- In 1888, the church of the Virgin Mary was demolished, so that a fountain could be installed in front of the church during the arrival of King Francis Joseph. The remaining stone base is incorrectly interpreted as the rest of the throne, on which Matija Gubec was tortured.
- From 1878 to 1882, the radical renovation of the church took place, when it acquired a neo-Gothic character according to the designs of architect F. Schmidt from Vienna and architect Hermann Bolle. During the renovation, an 1880 Zagreb earthquake significantly damaged the church. During that restoration, the following was done: the chapel of St. Fabijan and Sebastian, the floor in the church was significantly lowered, the tombs under the church were buried, the Renaissance west portal was demolished, all the inventory with the Baroque altars was removed, the Gothic frescoes were destroyed (which Kršnjavi wanted to preserve, but he failed), a choir was built, and according to Hermann Bolle's design, three altars made of vineyard stone were installed. From that Neo-Gothic phase, the following remains of the church: the western portal, the pediment, which overhangs the church roof over the southern portal (which fortunately was spared, like the bell tower, due to lack of money); there are neo-Gothic windows closed by painted glass designed by F. Schmidt, and the roof with glazed tiles is also from that era.
- From 1922, they began to think about a thorough renovation, in which pastor Svetozar Rittig, conservator Đ. Szabo, B. Bauer, engineer Šefček, painter J. Kljaković and sculptor Ivan Meštrović.
- By 1937, it was done: dampness was eliminated, a concrete blanket was installed, the vaults were gilded, the choir was enlarged, and the chapel of St. of Fabijan and Sebastian, (12×6 m), which is also painted. Stone and bronze works by Ivan Meštrović were brought into it, as well as into the church. This restitution, which largely removed the neo-Gothic layer and achieved the restoration of the building, emphasized the constructive beauty of that Gothic church. The architect E. Šen counted this renovation among the most successful of those years in Europe. He congratulated J. Kljaković, as well as the board the rector of Rome's "Academie di belle arti", architect Piacentini, during this intervention.
- 1970 – The church was rebuilt and structurally reinforced, the stone frames of the windows and their glass parts were also restored. The repair was carried out through the efforts of pastor M. Dudaš and the Commission for Religious Affairs of the City of Zagreb (Prof. Ivo Delala). Material resources were provided by the Zagreb City Assembly, the Fund for the Improvement of Cultural Activities of the SR of Croatia and voluntary contributions from the parishioners. The church is constantly being renovated, or better said, maintained and beautified. After World War II, research began on the southern portal, the bell tower and other necessary things are being repaired. During the Homeland War, the Banski dvori were bombed, during which the church was also damaged. The bell tower was renovated in 1994. The church got its present appearance in the last 20 years when the pastor was Msgr. Franjo Prstec. The church received new electrical installations, 6 new chandeliers, 20 pews were installed, the ceiling of the church was gilded with 22-carat gold leaf, the frescoes were restored, the sanctuary was decorated, a new 41 register organ was built and installed.

== In modern times ==
On 22 March 2020, the parish church of St. Mark was badly damaged in the 2020 Zagreb earthquake (vaults and Gothic ribs were damaged, in some parts the ceiling separated from the wall, the capstone on the southern portal fell); the tower and the sanctuary remained almost undamaged, as well as the wall paintings; chapel of St. Fabijana and Sebastijana suffered minor damage, and from 12 October 2020, access and movement on St. Mark's Square is limited due to 2020 St. Mark's Square attack.

On 3 December 2023, after the completion of the constructive and complete renovation, on the first Sunday of Advent, the first mass was celebrated in the parish church. The mass was celebrated and the church was blessed by Msgr. Mijo Gorski, assistant bishop of Zagreb, with the concelebration of Vladimir Magić, pastor and rector of the Academic Church of St. Katarina and Tomislav Haček, pastoral assistant. Singing at the mass was animated by the "Cantores sancti Marci" choir, and representatives of the Government of the Republic of Croatia participated in the mass, along with a large number of believers.

== Gallery ==
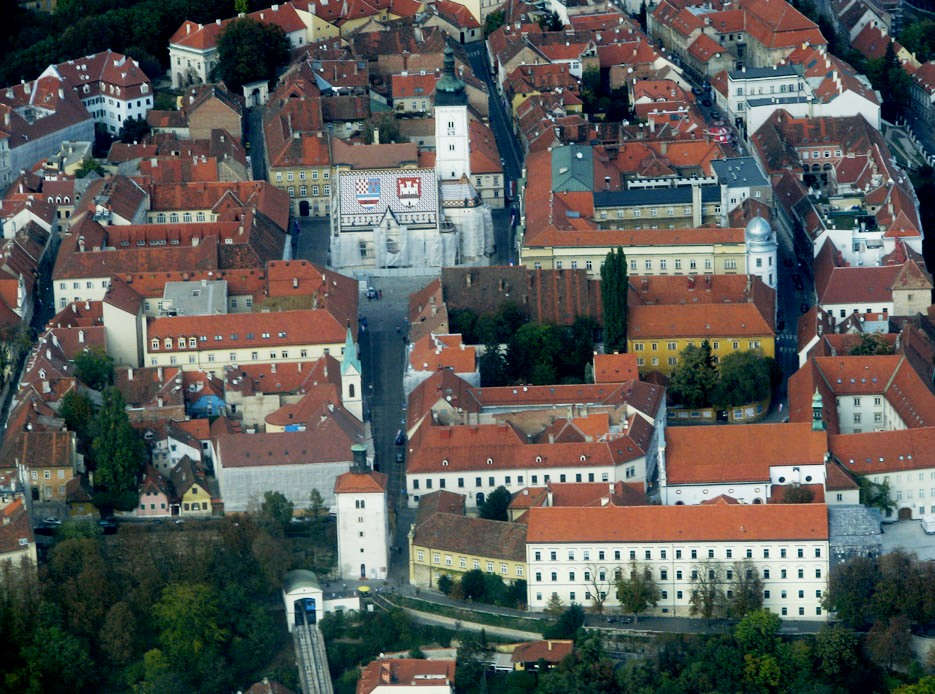
Aerial view of the Church and Upper town

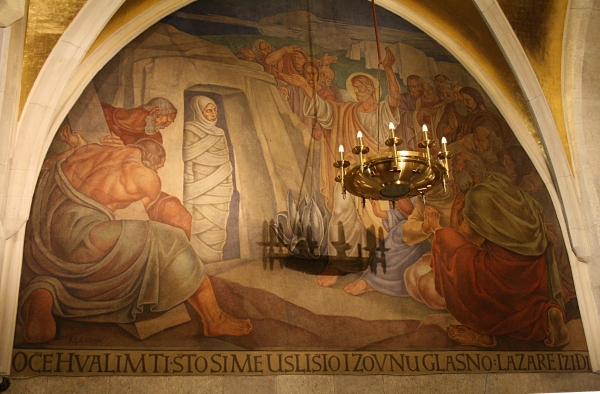
Interior

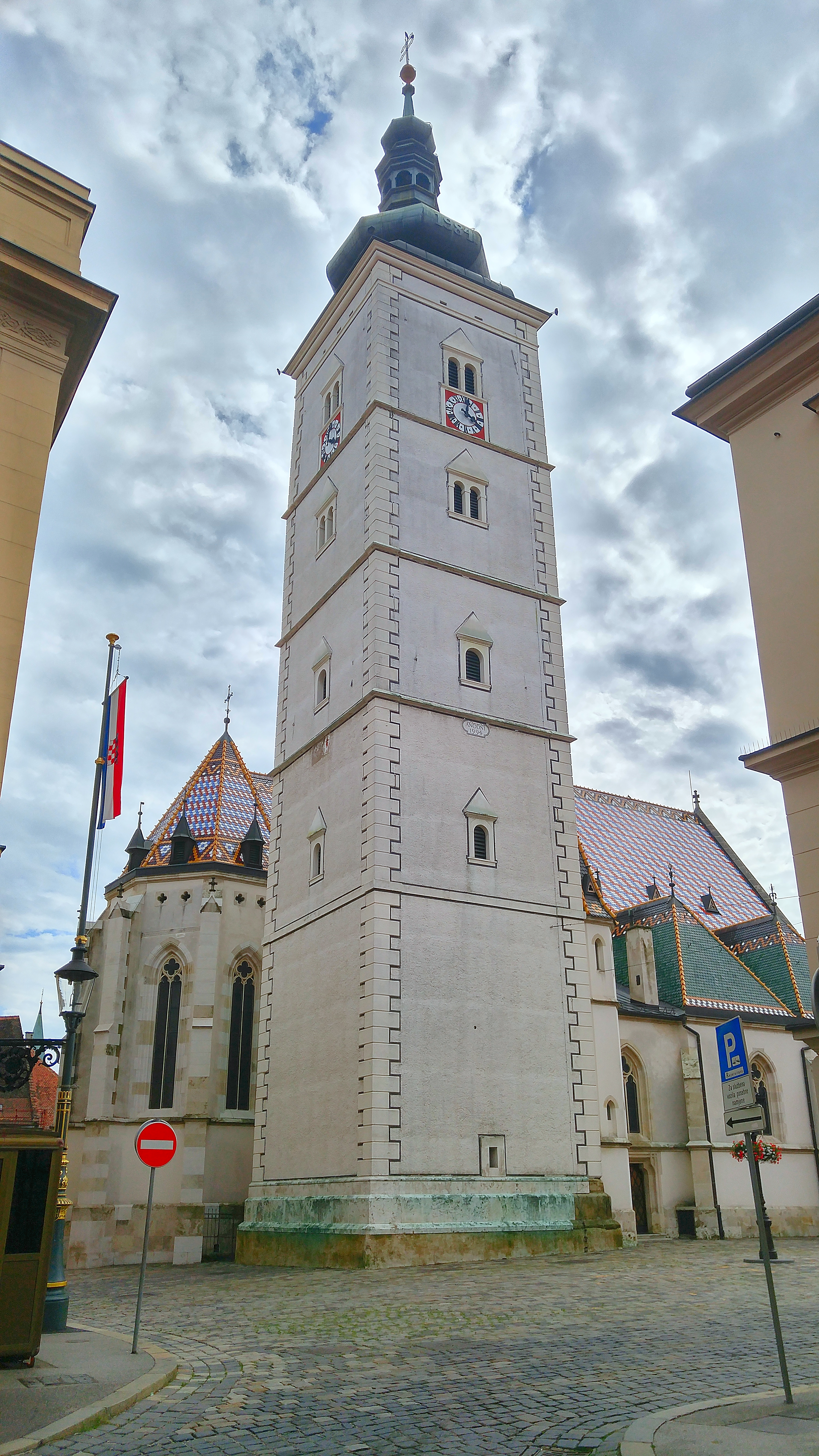
Bell tower of St. Mark's Church in Zagreb.

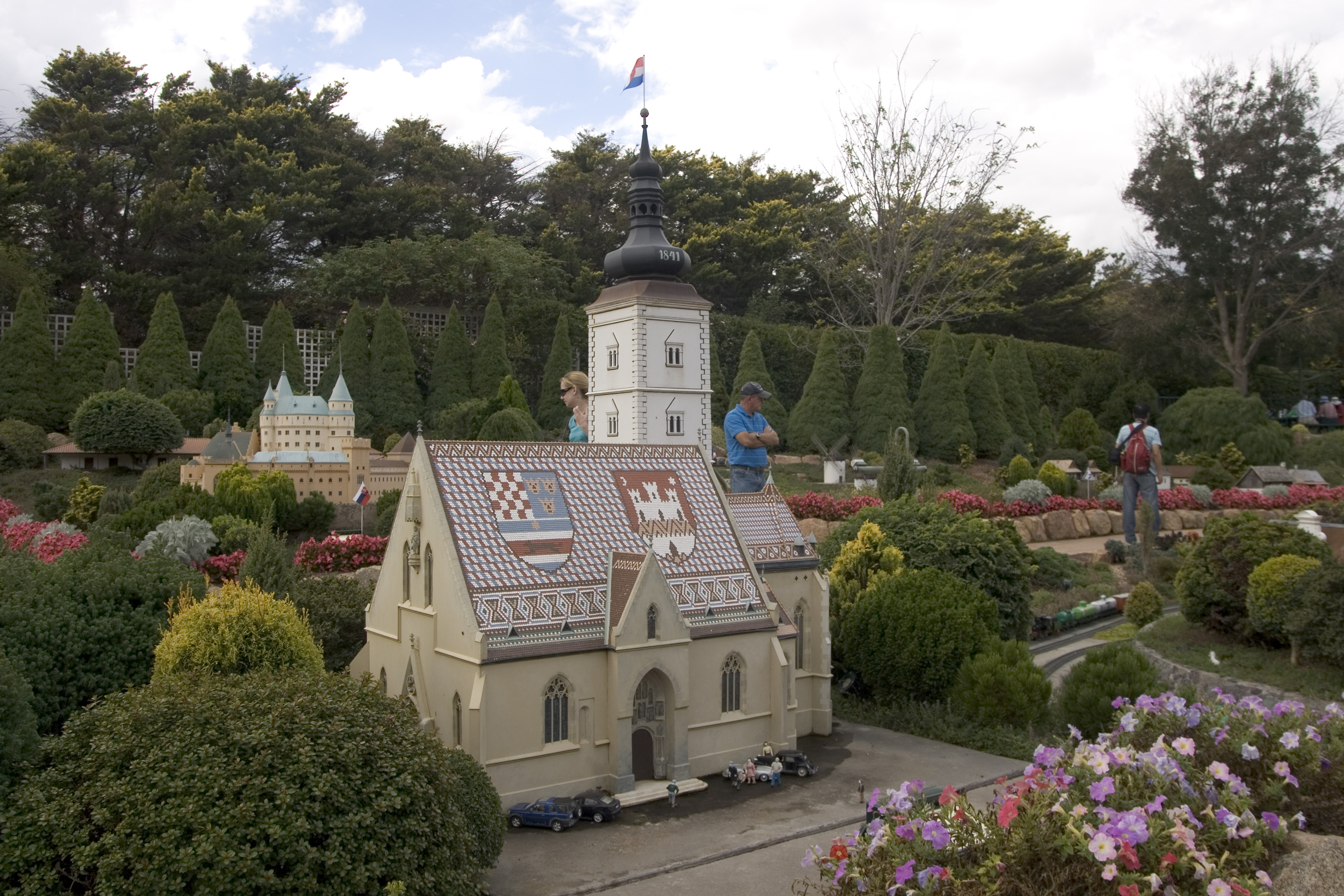
Model of St. Mark's Church in Cockington Green Gardens

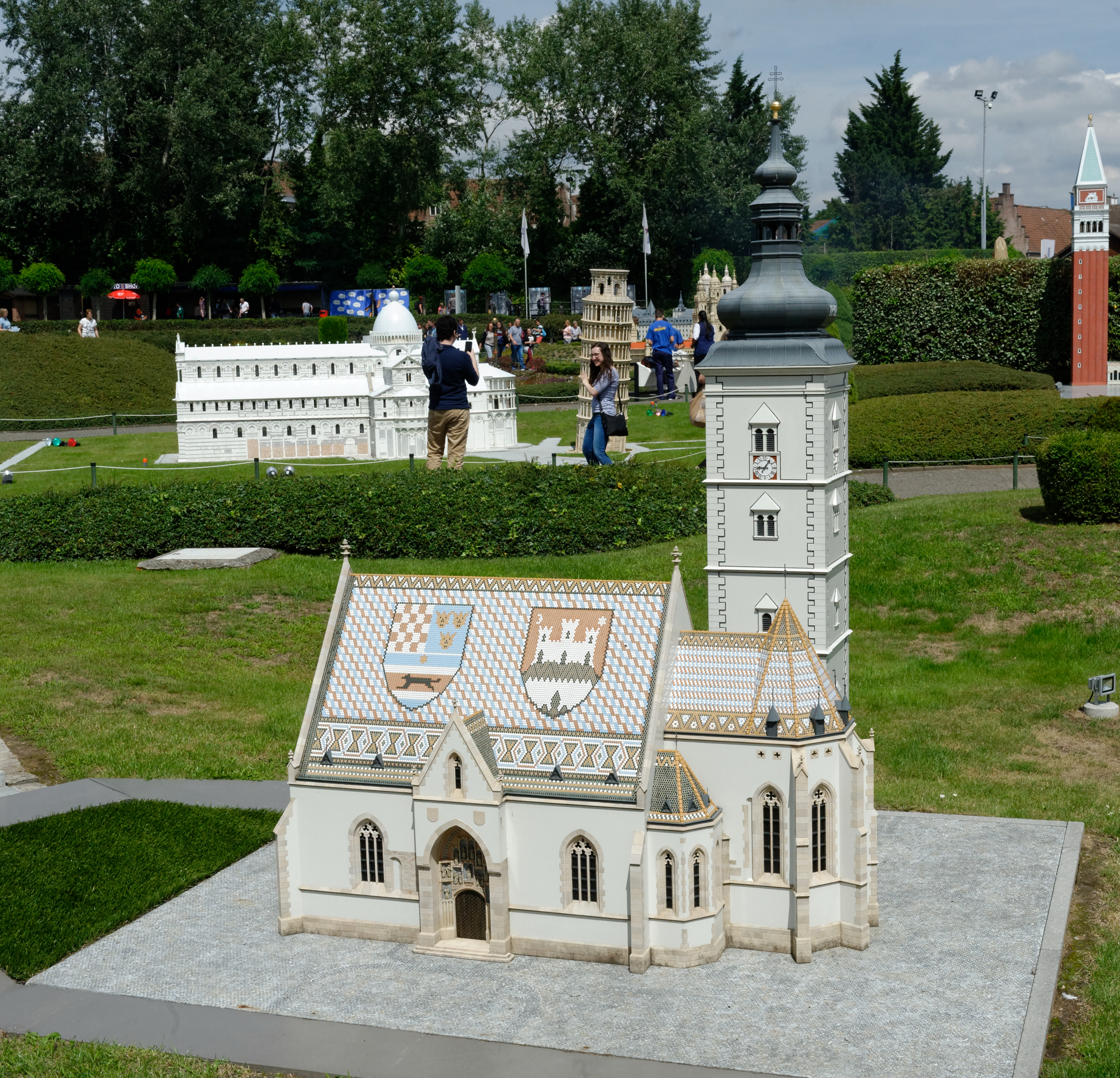
Model of the Church in Mini-Europe Brüssel

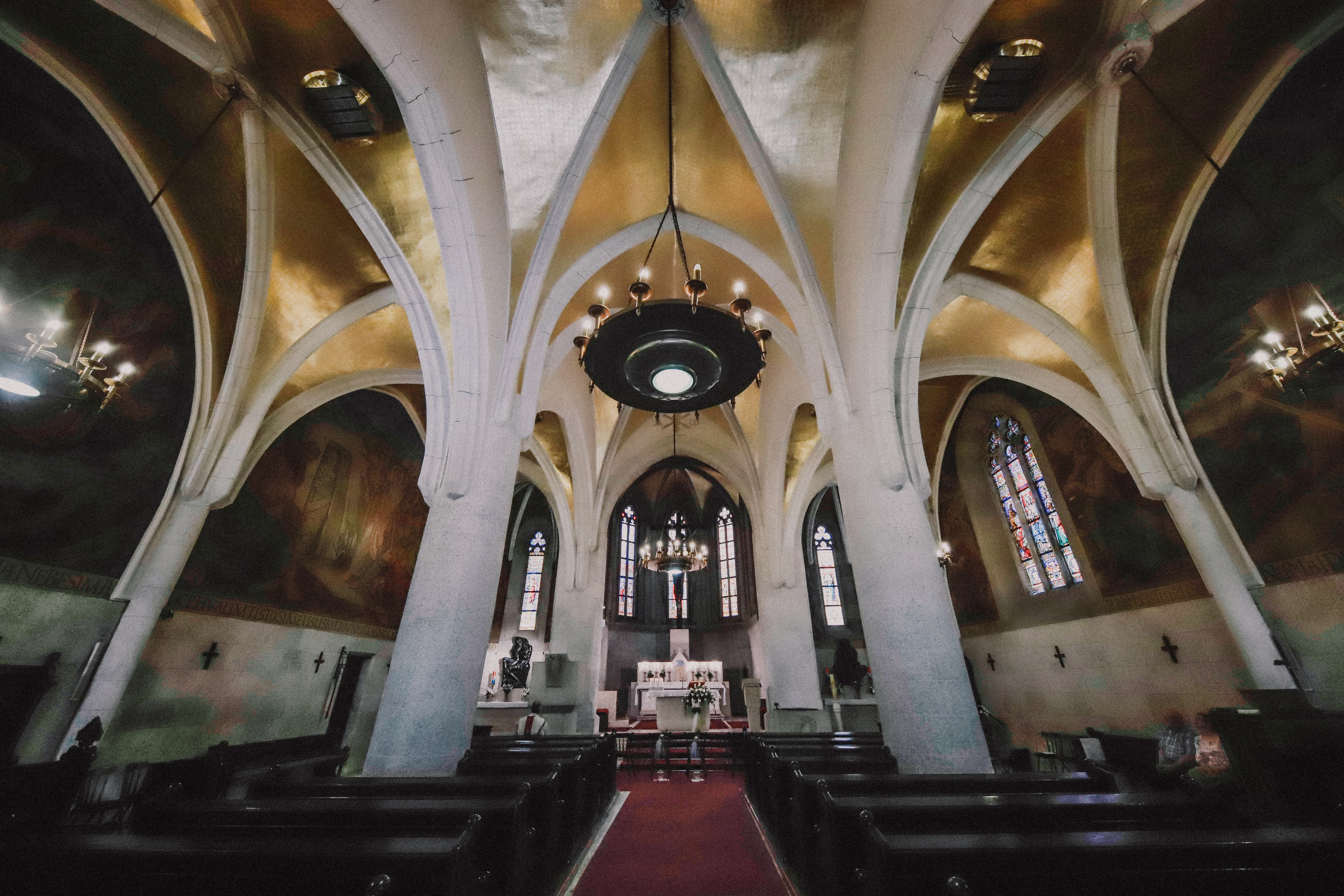
Interior

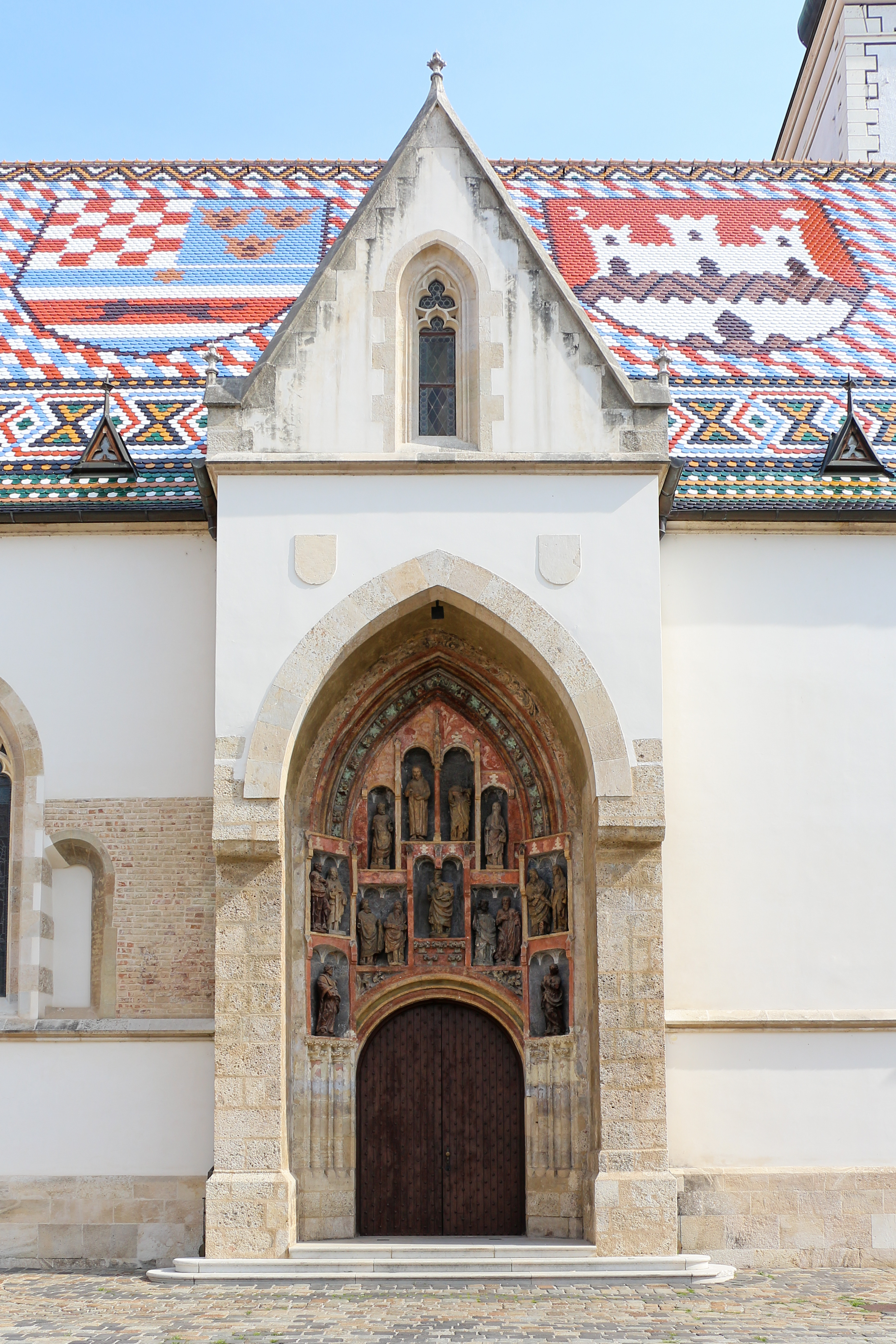
Portal entrance

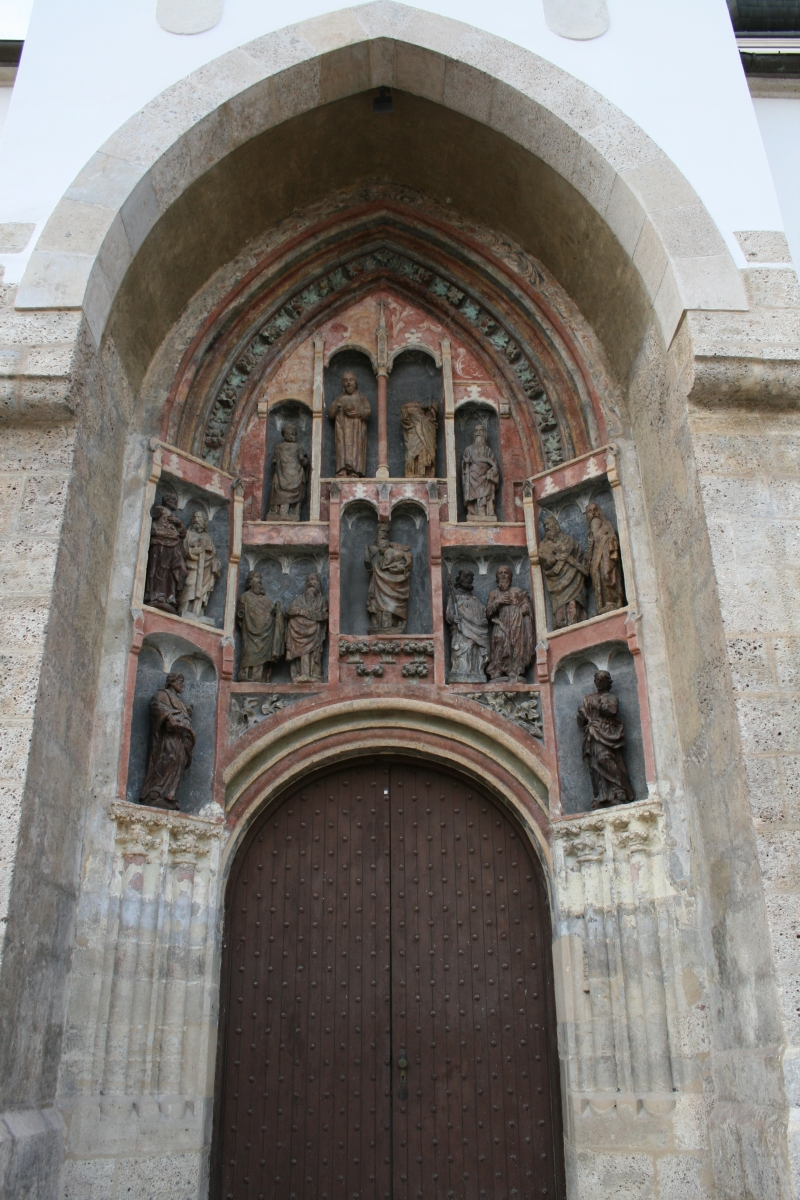
Close-up of the portal with Gothic wooden sculptures

== See also ==
- History of Zagreb
- Zagreb Cathedral
- Kaptol
- Gradec
