= Jim Lobe =

American journalist (born 1949)

Jim Lobe (born January 4, 1949) is an American journalist and the Washington Bureau Chief of the international news agency Inter Press Service.

== Bio ==
In 1970, Lobe graduated magna cum laude from Williams College in Williamstown (Massachusetts). He received his Juris Doctor from Boalt Hall School of Law at the University of California, Berkeley in 1974.

=== Journalist ===
Lobe has served as the Washington D.C. correspondent and Bureau Chief of Inter Press Service (IPS) from 1980 to 1985, and again from 1989 to the present. Since 2001, Lobe has served on the Foreign Policy in Focus Board of Advisors.

=== Coverage ===
After the Oklahoma City bombing in 1995, Inter Press Service released its analysis that said the perpetrators were most likely homegrown militia and pointed to the end date of feds' Waco siege against the Branch Davidians and the attack of a federal building. At the time, competitors were looking at Middle East terrorists. Lobe said IPS had scooped its media competitors on the point by 48 hours.

Lobe covered the ties between the post-9/11 agenda pursued by the Bush administration and the recommendations of the neoconservative-led Project for the New American Century.

== Publications ==
- Lobe, Jim and Oliveri, Adele; eds. (2003) I Nuovi Rivoluzionari: Il Pensiero dei Neoconservatori Americani. Milan: Feltrinelli. (Co-editor)
- Feffer, John; ed. (2003) Power Trip: U.S. Unilateralism and Global Strategy After September 11. New York: Seven Stories Press. (Contributor)
- Ackerman, S., Arkin, W., Marthoz, J., Wery, M.; eds., (2004) Les Etats-Unis a Contre-Courant: Critiques Americaines a L'Egard d'une Politique Etrangere Unilateraliste. Brussels: GRIP. (Contributor)
