= Non-Aligned News Agencies Pool =

- Native name: Pul nesvrstanih novinskih agencija / Пул несврстаних новинских агенција (Serbo-Croatian)
- Company type: State-owned enterprise
- Industry: News media
- Founded: 1974
- Defunct: 1990s
- Successor: NAM News Network (2005)
- Headquarters: Belgrade, SR Serbia, SFR Yugoslavia
- Owner: Tanjug on behalf of the Non-Aligned Movement member states media

The Non-Aligned News Agencies Pool (NANAP) was a cooperation system among news agencies of Non-Aligned countries, which lasted from 1975 to mid-1990s. The NANAP was initially led, funded, and supported by Yugoslavia's Tanjug, and gathered many state-owned news organizations, especially in Africa and Southern Asia. 26 news organizations joined the pool within the first year since the establishment.

It was also known by many different translations, such as the News Agencies Pool of Non-Aligned Countries, the Consorce of Non-Aligned News Agencies, and the Common Agency of Non-Aligned Countries.

The NANAP was founded in late 1974 and started operations in January, 1975, initially with a series of wires with statements and congratulations by their supporting heads of state. The idea responded to many calls for a new balance in world news made since the early 1970s by the Non-Aligned Movement (NAM) during the debates for a New World Information and Communication Order (NWICO). Later, these discussions would be hosted by the UNESCO and would culminate in the approval of the MacBride Report in its 20th conference in Belgrade, 1980.

In the meantime, the NANAP operated as an international, collaborative, charges-free, and institutional cooperation between news agencies of the Third World. Its main goal was to provide their own mass media channels with news which would be unbiased — or, at most, biased with their own worldview — and offer a counter-hegemonical report on world news concerning developing nations.

Tanjug, specifically, had a leading role not only by hosting and lending equipment, technicians, and training journalists from underdeveloped, poorer countries, but also by taking into the system its own self-management model. Although the Pool had no official headquarters, most of the operations in the first years were held in Belgrade.

Other active agencies in the Non-Aligned Pool were the Maghreb Arabe Presse (of Morocco), Tunisian TAP, Iraq's INA and Iranian IRNA.

The NANAP began a slow decline after 1980, when NWICO talks were moved to the UN framework, under the UNESCO. After both the United States and the United Kingdom retreated their memberships from the organization, the initiative lost financial support and suffered a boycott by pro-free-market Western institutions.

The decline in 1980 coincided with Josip Broz Tito's death, and the new leaderships in Yugoslavia deviated focus to other priorities. In the same year, Iraq and Iran started their 8-years war and the NANAP was used as a mean by both INA and IRNA to circulate propaganda warfare.

Although mostly inactive, the Pool was officially led by IRNA until the mid-1990s and then by Malaysia's Bernama until November 2005, when the Sixth Conference of Ministers of Information of Non-Aligned Countries (COMINAC VI) hosted in Kuala Lumpur endorsed its resurrection and transformation as the Internet-based NAM News Network (NNN).
