= Radio 24 =

Radio24 may refer to:

- Radio 24, one of the former names of Bernama Radio, a Malaysian news and talk radio station
- Radio 24 (Italy), the Italian private all-news radio, owned by the newspaper Il Sole 24 Ore
- Polskie Radio 24, a news radio station in Poland
