= Sheikh Raffie =

Sheikh Raffie (Sheikh Raffie Abd Rahman) is the Chief Operating Officer of BERNAMA (2007-2011), and co-founder of Radio24, Malaysia's first new radio in 2007.

== Education ==
He studied in the United Kingdom in International Politics & Strategic Studies.

== Career ==
Raffie was the main news anchor in ntv7 (Natseven TV) when it launched in 1997. In 1999, Raffie was Head of News at ntv7. Following that, he became an anchor for Channel News Asia in Singapore until 2001. In the next year, he returned to ntv7 to become Vice President of News and current affairs. From 2003 until 2005, he was the General Manager and Vice President of news, production, and engineering at Channel 9 and then became Head of Content in the following year. Raffie then joined BERNAMA as a consultant in 2007 as part of the set-up team for Radio24.
