= Roberto Savio =

Italian-Argentine journalist

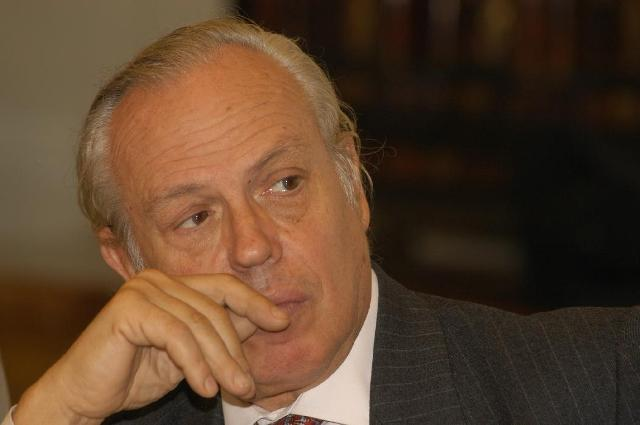
Roberto Savio.

Roberto Savio (born in Rome, Italy, but also holding Argentine nationality) is a journalist, communication expert, political commentator, activist for social and climate justice and advocate of global governance. He has spent most of his career with Inter Press Service (IPS), the news agency which he founded in 1964 along with Argentine journalist Pablo Piacentini.

== Education and early career ==
Savio studied economics at the University of Parma, followed by post-graduate courses in development economics, history of art and international law in Rome. He started his professional career as a research assistant in international law at the University of Parma.

While at university, Savio acted as an international officer with Italy’s National Student Association and the Youth Movement of Italy’s Christian Democracy party, eventually taking on responsibility for Christian Democracy’s relations with developing countries. After leaving university, he became international press chief for former Italian Prime Minister Aldo Moro. After the 1973 Chilean coup d'état, Savio left Italian politics to pursue journalism.

== Early journalistic career ==
Savio's career in journalism began with Italian daily Il Popolo and he went on to become director for News Services for Latin America with RAI, Italy’s state broadcasting company. He received a number of awards for TV documentaries, including the Saint-Vincent Award for Journalism.

== Inter Press Service (IPS) ==
With Argentine journalist Pablo Piacentini, Savio decided to create a press agency to enable Latin American exiles in Europe to write about their countries for a European audience. That agency, which was known in the early days as Roman Press Agency, became the Inter Press Service (IPS) news agency, which was formally established in Wesseling near Bonn. From the outset, it was decided that IPS would be a non-profit cooperative of journalists and its statute declared that two-thirds of the members should come from the South.

Under Savio, IPS won the Washington-based Population Institute's "most conscientious news service" award nine times in the 1990s.

IPS won FAO's A.H. Boerma Award for journalism in 1997 for its "significant contribution to covering sustainable agriculture and rural development in more than 100 countries, filling the information gap between developed and developing countries by focusing on issues such as rural living, migration, refugees and the plight of women and children".

On the initiative of Savio, IPS established the International Journalism Award in 1985 to honour outstanding journalists whose efforts, and often lives, contributed significantly to exposing human rights violations and advancing democracy, most often in developing countries. In 1991 it was renamed the International Achievement Award and given in recognition of the work of individuals and organisations that “continue to fight for social and political justice in the new world order”.

Savio is now president emeritus of IPS and chairman of the IPS board of trustees.

== Other News ==
In 2008, Roberto Savio launched the online Other News service to provide “information that markets eliminate”.

Other News publishes reports that have already appeared in niche media but not in mass circulation media, in addition to opinions and analyses from research centres, universities and think tanks – material that is intended to give readers access to news and opinion that they will not find in their local newspapers but which they might wish to read “as citizens who care about a world free from the pernicious effects of today’s globalisation”.

Other News also distributes daily analysis on international issues, particularly the themes of global governance and multilateralism, to several thousand policy-makers and leaders of civil society, in both English and Spanish.

== Communication initiatives ==
Savio has helped launched numerous communication and information projects.

Among others, Roberto Savio helped launch the National Information Systems Network (ASIN) for Latin America and the Caribbean, the UNESCO-sponsored Agencia Latinoamericana de Servicios Especiales de Informacion [Latin American Special Information Services Agency] (ALASEI), and the Women’s Feature Service (WFS), initially an IPS service and now an independent NGO with headquarters in New Delhi.

He also founded the Technological Information Promotion System (TIPS), a major U.N. project to implement and foster technological and economic cooperation among developing countries, and he developed Women into the New Network for Entrepreneurial Reinforcement (WINNER), a TIPS training project aimed at educating and empowering small and medium woman entrepreneurs in developing countries. The activities of TIPS are currently carried by the executing agency, Development Information Network (DEVNET), an international association which Roberto Savio helped create and which has been recognised by the United Nations as an NGO holding consultative status (category I) with the U.N. Economic and Social Council (ECOSOC).

Roberto Savio has also been actively involved in promoting exchanges between regional information services, such as between ALASEI and the Organisation of Asian News Agencies (OANA) now known as the Organisation of Asia-Pacific News Agencies, and between the PanAfrican News Agency (PANA) and the Federation of Arab News Agencies (FANA).

Roberto Savio was instrumental in placing the concept of a Development Press Bulletin Service Tariff on the agenda of UNESCO’s International Commission for the Study of Communication Problems (MacBride Commission).

Roberto Savio has also worked closely in the field of information and communication with many United Nations organisations, including the United Nations Development Programme (UNDP), the United Nations Environment Programme (UNEP), the United Nations Educational, Scientific and Cultural Organisation (UNESCO), the United Nations Population Fund (UNFPA), the United Nations Children’s Fund (UNICEF) and the United Nations Institute for Training and Research (UNITAR).

== Achievements and awards ==
In 1970, Roberto Savio received the Saint-Vincent Award for Journalism, the most prestigious journalism award in Italy, for a five-part series on Latin America which was recognised as “best TV transmission”.

He was awarded the Hiroshima Peace Award in 2013 for his “contribution towards the construction of a century of peace by ‘giving voice to the voiceless’ through Inter Press Service for nearly five decades”.

He received the Joan Gomis Memorial Award (Catalunya) for Journalism for Peace in 2013.

In October 2016, during the 31st Festival of Latin American Cinema in Trieste, Italy, Roberto Savio received the "Salvador Allende" award, given to honour a personality from the world of culture, art or politics who actively supported the conservation of Latin America's rich history and culture.

In 2019, he received a special diploma from the President of Chile, Michelle Bachelet, for his role of solidarity during the Chilean military dictatorship. He was appointed by President of the Republic Mattarella, one of the twelve Knights of the Order of Merit of the Italian Republic for 2021. He also received an honorary degree in political science from the United Nations Peace University in 2021.

== Advisory activities ==
Roberto Savio served as Senior Adviser for Strategies and Communication to the Director General of the International Labour Organization (ILO) from 1999 to 2003. He also served as an internal communication consultant to Catherine Bertini, Executive Director of the World Food Programme (WFP), in 2000.

== Affiliations ==
From 1999 to 2003, Roberto Savio was a board member of the Training Centre for Regional Integration, based in Montevideo, Uruguay.

After several years as a member of the Governing Council of the Society for International Development (SID), the world’s oldest international civil society development organisation, he was elected Secretary-General for three terms, and is now the organisation’s Secretary-General Emeritus.

Roberto Savio was founder and President of Indoamerica, an NGO that promotes education in poor areas of Argentina suffering from social breakdown.

He has been a member of the International Committee of the World Social Forum (WSF) since it was established in 2001, a member of the International Council and was elected as Coordinator of the ‘Media, Culture and Counter-Hegemony’ thematic area at WSF 2003.

Roberto Savio is co-founder of Media Watch International, based in Paris, of which he is Secretary General.

Until 2009, Roberto Savio was Chairman of the Board of the Alliance for a New Humanity, an international foundation established in Puerto Rico, which has been promoting the culture of peace since 2001 and whose Board includes thinker Deepak Chopra, Spanish judge Balthazar Garzon, Nobel prize winners Oscar Arias and Betty Williams, and philanthropists Ray Chambers, Solomon Levis and Howard Rosenfield. He is now a member of the Board.

He is Deputy Director of the Scientific Council of the New Policy Forum (formerly the World Policy Forum), founded by Mikhail Gorbachev and based in Luxembourg, to provide a space for reflection and new thinking on the current international situation by influential global leaders.

Roberto Savio is responsible for international relations of the European Centre for Peace and Development, based in Belgrade, whose mission is to contribute to peace and development in Europe and to international cooperation in the transfer of knowledge based on the premise that development under conditions of peace is only possible when conceived as human development.

Roberto Savio is Chairman of Accademia Panisperna, a cultural meeting space in the centre of Rome, and is President of Arcoiris TV, an online TV channel with the world’s largest collection of videos and registrations of political and cultural events (over 70,000 hours), based in Modena, Italy.

In 2016, Roberto Savio started contributing on a monthly basis to the Wall Street International Magazine with an economical and political column.

== Films and publications ==
In 1972, Roberto Savio produced a three-part documentary on Che Guevara titled ‘Che Guevara – Inchiesta su un mito’ (Che Guevara – Investigation of a Myth), and has also produced five films, two of which were presented at the Venice and Cannes film festivals.

Roberto Savio has published several books, including ‘Verbo America’ together with Alberto Luna (1990), which deals with the cultural identity of Latin America, and ‘The Journalists Who Turned the World Upside Down’ (2012), which has been published in three languages (English, Italian and Spanish), is a collection of narratives by over 100 IPS journalists and key global players, including Nobel Peace Prize laureates, who have supported the agency. It looks at information and communication as key elements in changes to the old post-Second World War and post-Cold War worlds. It provides an insight into the idealism that fired many of those who worked for the agency as well as the high esteem in which it was held by many prominent figures in the international community.

In October 2016, Roberto Savio presented the first Other News publication: “Remembering Jim Grant: Champion for Children”, an online edition of the book dedicated to Jim Grant, UNICEF Executive Director 1980-1995, who saved 25 million children

In April 2022, together with Giuliano Rizzi, he published the book "Manual for... changing the world. For young people who want to (con)tribute to creating a future global citizenship". In 2024, the text "Manual for the global citizen" was published in various languages and saw the collaboration of many authors for its contextualization in different nations.

== Current activities ==
Roberto Savio is currently engaged in a campaign for the governance of globalisation and social and climate justice, which takes him as a speaker to numerous conferences worldwide, and about which he produces a continuous stream of articles and essays.

He is Deputy Director of the Scientific Council of the New Policy Forum (formerly the World Policy Forum), founded by Mikhail Gorbachev and based in Luxembourg, to provide a space for reflection and new thinking on the current international situation by influential global leaders.

Roberto Savio is responsible for international relations of the European Centre for Peace and Development, based in Belgrade, whose mission is to contribute to peace and development in Europe and to international cooperation in the transfer of knowledge based on the premise that development under conditions of peace is only possible when conceived as human development.

Roberto Savio is Chairman of Accademia Panisperna, a cultural meeting space in the centre of Rome, and is President of Arcoiris TV, an online TV channel with the world’s largest collection of videos and registrations of political and cultural events (over 70,000 hours), based in Modena, Italy.

Member of the Executive Committee for Fondazione Italiani, established in Rome, which publishes an online weekly magazine and organizes conferences about global issues.

Member of the Maurice Strong Sustainability Award Selection Panel, established by the Global Sustainability Forum.
