= Coat of arms of Zagreb =

- Armiger: City of Zagreb
- Adopted: August 3, 1896
- Shield: Against an Azure ground on a Vert hill: an Argent walled moat with three towers and open Or gates. An Or six-pointed mullet Sinister and an Argent crescent Dexter.

The coat of arms of Zagreb in Croatia consists of a three-towered city with a star and a crescent moon overhead. The coat of arms dates back to at least the 18th century.

== History ==
Heraldry, the study of coats of arms and genealogies, first gained traction in Croatia toward the end of the 14th century, with significant works on the subject appearing by the 18th century. Local interest in this field led to an exploration of the history and meaning behind Zagreb’s coat of arms.

Although the city's documented history begins with the establishment of a diocese in the 11th century, archaeological evidence points to earlier settlements. The oldest known part of Zagreb was likely in the area of today's Kaptol, with some remains showing a settlement existed there in the 10th and 11th centuries, before the diocese was officially founded in 1094.

The settlement of Gradec was first mentioned in a 1201 document as Castrum Grec juxta Zagrabiam (The Fortress of Grec near Zagreb). After the Tatar invasion, King Bela IV granted Gradec the status of a Free Royal City with the issuance of the Golden Bull, a charter that significantly shaped its future.

=== The Evolution of Zagreb's Coat of Arms ===
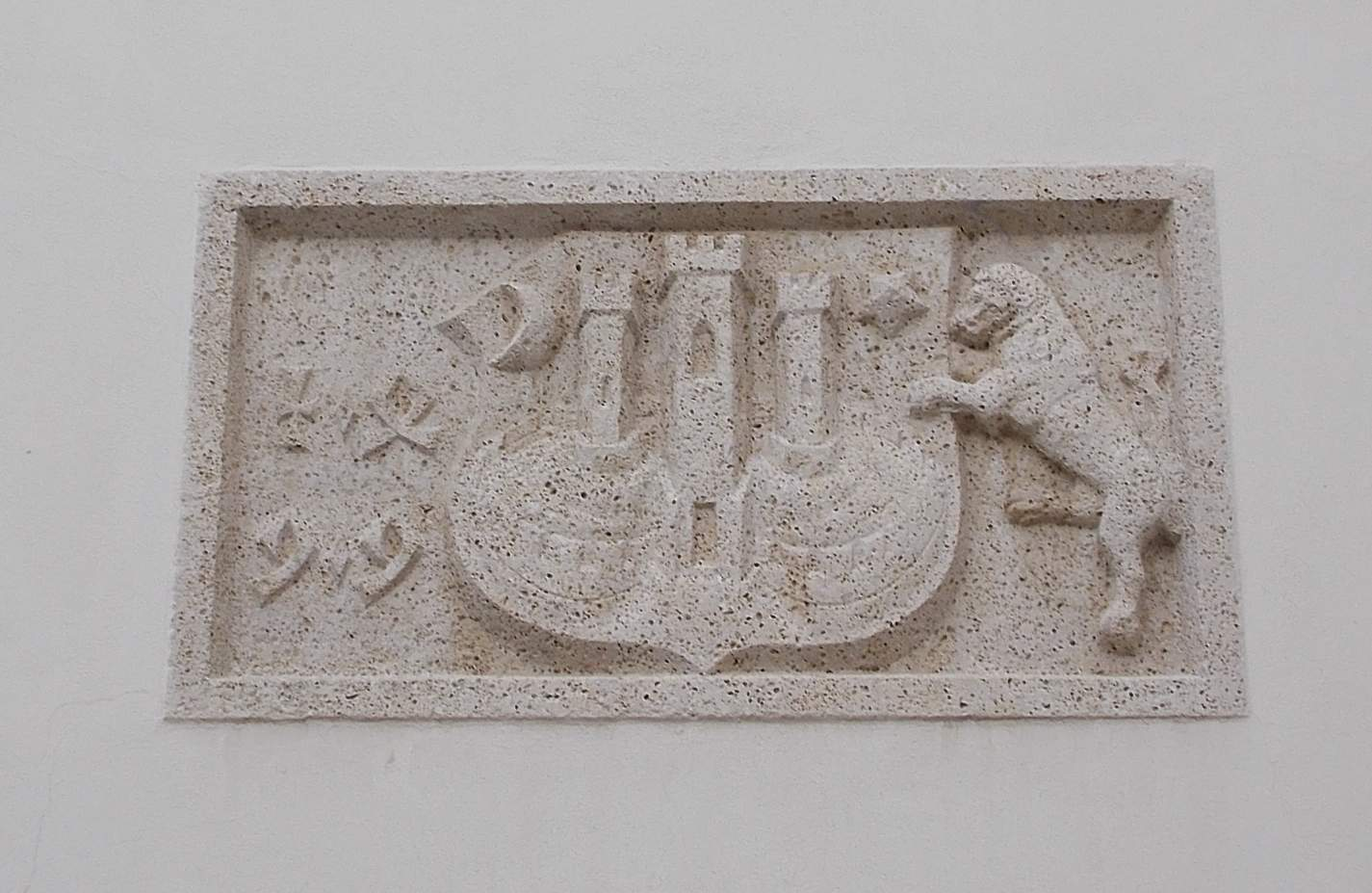
The oldest known Coat of arms of Zagreb, St. Mark's Church

The coat of arms of Zagreb is based on the 13th-century coat of arms of Grič, another name for Gradec. While seals were likely in use on both Kaptol and Grič before the 14th century, the oldest surviving seal of Gradec dates back to the 14th century. As noted by heraldry expert Željko Heimer, this seal depicts a heraldic composition rather than a true coat of arms. It features three towers with crowns rising from a city wall, with a Gothic gate in the center. To the left of the gate is a crescent with three roses, and to the right is an eight-pointed star with two roses. The seal is inscribed with S: COMVNI: DE MONTE GRACI (Seal of the municipality on Gradec hill).

The oldest known depiction of the Gradec coat of arms, which omits the decorative roses, dates to 1499. It was located on a wall of the Chapel of Saints Fabian and Sebastian, which stood next to St. Mark's Church until 1876.

After the unification of the municipalities into the single city of Zagreb in 1850, a new city emblem was needed. In 1896, the city council officially adopted a coat of arms based on a proposal by Ivan pl. Bojničić, a leading heraldry expert and director of the Royal Land Archives in Zagreb. Following Croatia’s independence in 1993, new regulations for the coat of arms and flag were implemented, with irregularities being resolved by the 1999 Statute.

=== Symbolism and Meaning ===
The current coat of arms of Zagreb has largely remained unchanged since the Middle Ages. Its official description, or blazon, is: "In a blue field on a green hill there is a silver/white city with three towers and an open golden/yellow gate; above right a golden/yellow six-pointed star, above left a silver/white crescent."

- The green hill represents Gradec hill, one of the oldest parts of the city.
- The fortress with three towers symbolizes the settlement of Gradec.
- The open gate signifies the hospitality and protective nature of Zagreb's residents, offering a welcome to guests and shelter to travelers.
- The star and crescent are ancient symbols of old Slavic, pre-Christian deities of beauty and love: the goddess Lada (star) and the god Lelj (crescent). These symbols are also found in some of the oldest Croatian coats of arms.
- The blue shield, often combined with the white/silver fortress, represents the Christian motif of the Assumption of the Virgin Mary, symbolizing the conflict between the divine and the human, heaven and earth.
- While a red shield was more common in the 18th century, the use of a blue shield became fully established in the 19th century and has since been the standard.
