= Piacentini =

Piacentini is an Italian surname. Notable people with the surname include:

- Genison Piacentini de Quadra (born 1988), Brazilian footballer
- Giorgio Piacentini (born 1997), Italian footballer
- Giovanni Piacentini (born 1968), Italian footballer
- John Piacentini, American psychologist
- Jorge Piacentini (1920–1995), Argentine sailor
- Luigi Piacentini (born 1930), Italian field hockey player
- Marcello Piacentini (1881–1960), Italian architect
- Matteo Piacentini (born 1999), Italian football player
- Pablo Piacentini (died 2017), Argentinian political scientist, journalist and activist
- Pio Piacentini (1846–1928), Italian architect
- Riccardo Piacentini (born 1958), Italian classical composer and pianist
- Rosy Piacentini (born 1938), French former swimmer
- Settimio Piacentini (1859–1921), Italian general
- Valentino Piacentini (born 1978), Italian former international table tennis player

== Other ==
- Colli Piacentini ("Hills of Piacenza"), Italian wine region located at the western end of Emilia-Romagna
