= Bernama =

News agency of the government of Malaysia

Coordinates: 3.1715006°N 101.7100206°E

Malaysian National News Agency Pertubuhan Berita Nasional Malaysia
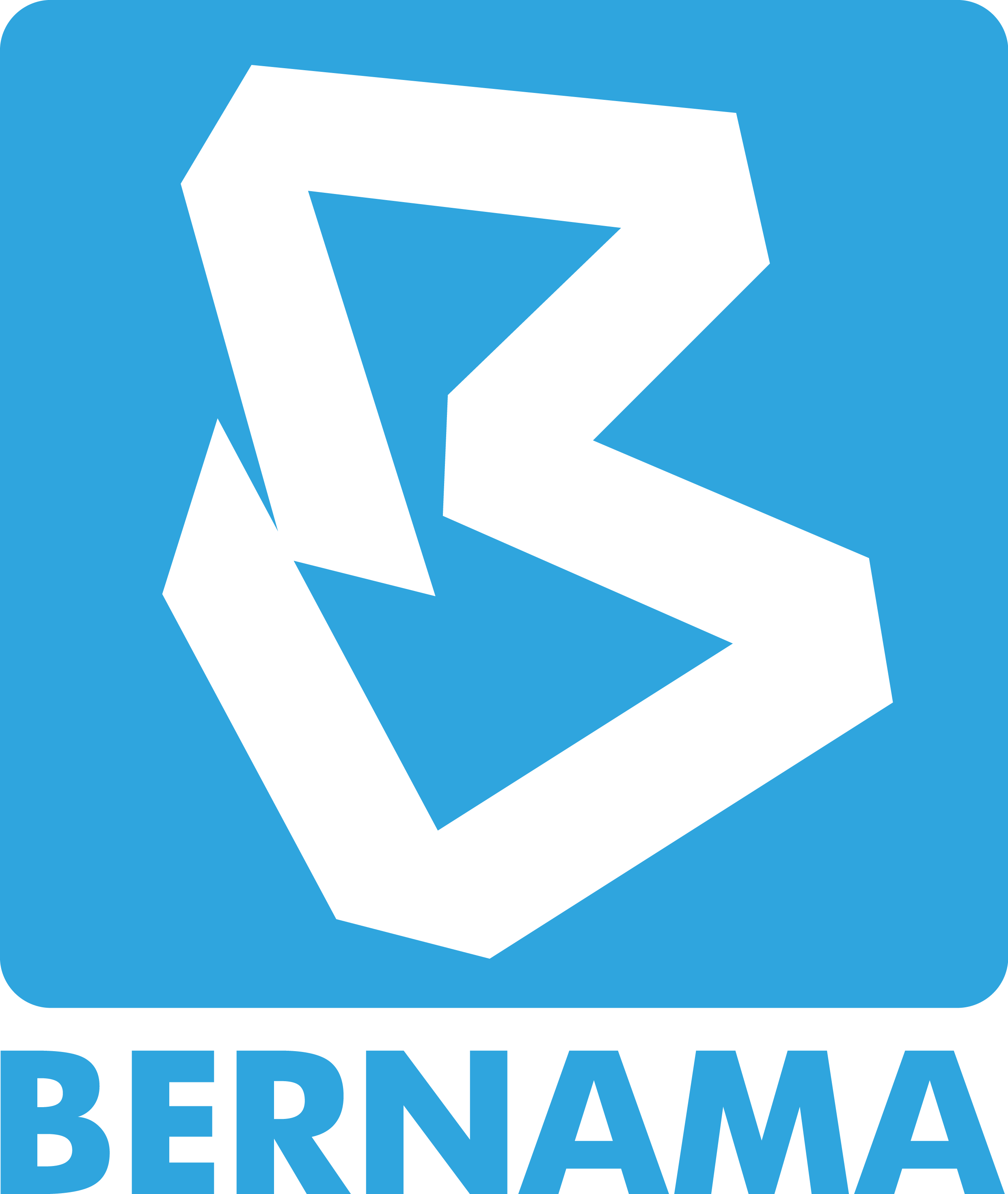
- Type: Statutory corporation
- Industry: News media
- Founded: 6 April 1967; 59 years ago
- Headquarters: Wisma Bernama, Jalan Tun Razak, Kuala Lumpur, Malaysia
- Area served: Worldwide
- Key people: Datuk Seri Wong Chun Wai (Chairman); Nur-ul Afida Kamaludin (Chief Executive Officer); Arul Rajoo Durar Raj (Editor-in-Chief); Ahmad Fuad Yahya (Deputy Editor-in-Chief Domestic News Service); Khairdzir Md Yunus (Deputy Editor-in-Chief Business and Finance News Service); Jamaluddin Muhammad (Deputy Editor-in-Chief International News Service)
- Products: Wire service
- Owner: Government of Malaysia
- Number of employees: 700 (2022)
- Parent: Ministry of Communications Malaysia
- Website: www.bernama.com

The Malaysian National News Agency (Malay: Pertubuhan Berita Nasional Malaysia), is a news agency of the government of Malaysia. It is an autonomous body under the Ministry of Communications. Headquartered at the Wisma Bernama, off Jalan Tun Razak near National Library, Kuala Lumpur, it was created by an Act of Parliament in 1967 and began operating on 20 May 1968. Most of the news media in Malaysia and Singapore and international news agencies subscribe to Bernama.

Apart from providing services to its clients using wires, Bernama also provides news broadcasts through its own namesake radio and television channel, which operated 24 hours a day as well as its social media platforms. Apart from Malay and English, it also publishes content in Chinese, Tamil, Spanish and Arabic. Bernama (usually stylized in all caps) is an abbreviation of Berita Nasional Malaysia (Malaysia National News); it also means named or titled in the Malay language.

== History ==
=== Formation ===
Bernama traces its roots to 1959 when the Malay Journalist Association on 30 March have adopted a resolution that urging the Federal Government to set up a news agency that could contribute to the "furtherance of the national interests and of understanding between Malaya and other nations".

In 1962, the then-Director of Information Services, Mohamed Sopiee felt that the Malayan press "should get together and run a national news agency on a cooperative basis" and insisted that the "news in this country properly collected and sent out to other countries". On 14 July the same year, the Malayan press and media practitioners decided in principle to create a news agency, which will be a "cooperative, non-profit making and independent organisation" and "promote the free flow of news within the country and true understand of Malaya abroad". Sadao Roy Otake, the executive news editor of Japanese news agency, Kyodo News Agency fled to Malaya on 26 November to help in forming the national news agency. He said that the formation of the unnamed Malayan news agency as a non-profit organisation raising concern without the interference from the Government and demanded that Malaysia, known as Malaya at that time, needed a news agency to disseminate news to Malayan people and the rest of the world. He also disclosed that the unnamed news agency of Malaya is expected to be launched by August 1963, a month prior to what would have been the formation of Malaysia.

The then-Deputy Prime Minister, Abdul Razak Hussein on 5 August 1965 announced that the Federal Government agreed to set up a news agency as soon as possible, revealing the Bernama name to the public. In November, the then-Minister of Information and Broadcasting, Senu Abdul Rahman announced the establishment of Bernama, and expected to launch in 1966, or in February 1967 in the following three phases:

- Phase 1: Recruiting officers who would operate the agency.
- Phase 2: Carry out smaller tasks to send news to the local newspapers.
- Phase 3: Sending correspondents to certain cities in the world.

A white paper containing a proposal to establish a news agency received approval from the Cabinet in July 1965. D.J. Dallas, an international news specialist from Reuters was sent by UNESCO to investigate each aspects of Bernama's establishment thoroughly. The upcoming news agency will be operated in two languages, Malay and English. On 22 December 1966, the establishment of Bernama was approved by the Cabinet. It also revealed that Bernama will incorporate a new system called teleprinter connection system which will "incorporated between its office in Kuala Lumpur and its branch in Sabah and Sarawak". A bill on Bernama's establishment was tabled to the Dewan Rakyat on 19 January 1967; vital changes to the bill were made when Senu move important amendments to Bernama. However, the bill was amended again in which the new amendment replaced the old amendment that distributed before. The new bill ensure Bernama could provide news content with "credible and accurate, without touching public, national interests and community's views". The bill passed on 8 March 1967. Senu said that the formation of Bernama is "not intended to blocked the press freedom", but instead to "developing news contents even more". The Dewan Rakyat assured that Bernama will be an "independent, corporate body and not a government news agency".

Bernama was established under the Act of Parliament on 6 April 1967 and launched a day prior to what would have been 10th anniversary of Malaysia's independence, on 30 August 1967 and officiated by the then-Prime Minister, Tunku Abdul Rahman. Abdul Aziz Yeop become its first chairman. In September 1967, Bernama was invited to be the member of the Organization of Asia-Pacific News Agencies (OANA) and officially became a full member a year later, in September 1968. A month later, Bernama is looking for three top executive posts to fill the position.

=== Beginning of operations ===
On 9 April 1968, Bernama announced that it would start operations by 1 May, but it officially commenced its operations on 20 May. At the time it began operations, Bernama has only 20 staffs with its headquarters located at the four-room bungalow at Jalan Pekeliling, Kuala Lumpur. In its inaugural meeting on 30 July, the then-Secretary to the Ministry of Information and Broadcasting, Junid Abd Rahim said that the Government will spend RM500,000 for Bernama, which was part of the RM1.5 million launching grant to Bernama.

In June 1968, Bernama received 9 subscribers to its news service. In December the same year, it sought assistance from the Thomson Foundation for its expansion programme.

In 1971, Bernama partnered with Indonesian news agency, Antara for news partnership. In 1972, Bernama planned to take control on foreign news while it was in talks for sole distribution rights in Malaysia with four international news agencies, including Reuters and Associated Press.

In 1978, Bernama planned to introduce a photo service by 1979 and a radio teletype service by 1981. These services were meant for overseas transmissions purposes. In 1979, Bernama proposed its plan to open its office in Manila, Philippines before the year-end. It would be the news agency's first regional office outside of Malaysia.

In 1981, Bernama was selected as a host for the four-day Asean news agencies conferences which expected to held in October, which took place officially from 2 to 5 November and attended by 23 international news agencies.

In September 1982, Bernama partnered with Kyodo News Agency to launch a 24-hour communications link for better news exchange between the two agencies. Days later, Bernama opened its bureau in Singapore and managed by two Bernama officials.

On 1 February 1983, Bernama held a new daily news file on developments in ASEAN countries.

In July 1983, the Government decided to turn Bernama as a sole distributor of foreign news from international news outlets. Editors and publishers in the country have been consulted to Bernama following the move. A month later, it was reported that Bernama would likely to sold to private investors. Information Minister at that time, Adib Adam clarified that the privatisation of Bernama could run on a "profit-oriented basis". In September that year, Bernama steps into foreign news distribution plan, inline with the government's decision to channel foreign news to Malaysian newspapers via its platform, albeit received objection from newspaper editors. It also took the responsibility to provide a teletext service that could help to generate its income.

In January 1984, Bernama signed an agreement with the German news agency, Deutsche Presse-Agentur (DPA) to enter a commercial arrangement for the distribution of the latter's service. In February, the news agency announced that it will introduce an AP-Telerate financial information service.

On 16 March, Bernama signed an agreement with the United Press International (UPI) for the distribution of the latter's news and picture services in Malaysia by Bernama. Starting on 1 May 1984, Bernama will transform as a standalone news distributor from all international news agencies operated in Malaysia. At the same time, it moved its new headquarters from MCOBA Building, Jalan Syed Putra to Jalan Tun Razak.

Bernama became the first news agency in Asia to incorporate editorial computer in its operation in 1984.

In September, Bernama launched the Bernama AP-Dow Jones Telerate Service, a financial news service that allowed international business community to obtain access to global information on the world's financial market.

In November of the same year, Bernama pivoted towards teletext service with the launch of the Bernama Newscan service which provides up-to-date news via video terminals. The service made available in Malay and English and targeted to hotels, banks and other business premises. Days later, the then-Information Minister, Rais Yatim announced that Bernama would likely to be privatised.

In September 1985, Rais confirmed that the agency will be corporatised into a private entity, pending approval from the Government, citing that it is "being studied", including the review of the Bernama Act. The plan was later abandoned.

On 14 December 1985, Bernama in collaboration with Xinhua News Agency to signing their inaugural bilateral news exchange agreement.

In 1986, Bernama began supplying news materials, articles and information on current development to Malaysian diasporas. The cost of sending news contents to Malaysian diasporas would be bore by the Government. It also signed an agreement with Sime Darby's wholly owned subsidiary, Sime Darby Systems to create a nationwide voice grade communications network which covers all major towns in Malaysia.

The Government in September 1987 have considered the idea to amend the Bernama Act in which Bernama would likely to be "profit-oriented" organisation rather than a non-profit organisation and allowed the agency to operated commercially. In October that year, Bernama set up an online real-time information database, known as Bernama Livecom. The service aims to provide packaged business information to all business premises.

On 13 April 1988, Bernama partnered with the Turkish news agency, Anadolu News Agency as part of its expansion of the international news exchange network.

In December, Bernama secured RM16.5 loan from two banks, one of them is Permata Chartered Merchant Bank, to recover the existing loan for its headquarters in Jalan Tun Razak.

In 1989, Bernama began to increased its presence in the electronic media marketplace by launching Bernama Monitor and Newscan II, awhile at the same time, it acquires 400 personal computers for both services.

=== Later years ===
On 27 February 1990, the Government tabled a bill at the Dewan Rakyat to grant Bernama a specific rights to determine the types of news materials from international news agencies which it "considered suitable for local publications". Ahead of the privatisation of Bernama, the then-Information Minister, Mohamed Rahmat said that the proposed privatisation will only involves certain aspects of its operations.

In June the same year, the amendment of the 1967 Bernama Act was tabled again in Parliament. The amendment was "not intended to restrict, control or abuse press freedom in the country". A day later, Bernama was given sole rights to receive and distribute news in the country and allowed to ventured into business to ensure it is self-financed after the Parliament passed amendments of the act.

In January 1991, Bernama partnered with Hongkong Bank to launch a daily facsimile news service, known as Bernama-Hongkong Bank Five O'Clock Digest.

The plan for privatisation of Bernama revived in September 1991 when its Editor-in-Chief at that time, Abdul Rahman Sulaiman said that the agency will be undergoing a major restructuring as part of its preparation to transform itself into a private entity. By early 1992, Bernama inked a joint venture agreement with Pegi Malaysia's wholly owned subsidiary, Applied Information Management Services to marketed a new real-time financial information service, known as the Information Edge. The joint venture was launched on 21 January 1992 and officiated by the then-Information Minister, Mohamed Rahmat.

In March 1992, Bernama launched a personal computer-based technical analysis service on price movements on the Kuala Lumpur Stock Exchange (now Bursa Malaysia) which targeted for investors.

The then-Deputy Prime Minister, Ghafar Baba confirmed that the Government will corporatised Bernama by the end of 1993 and will privatised within 3 years while clarified that the move will "help enhance the country's communications facilities". Bernama has set up its third regional office in Hanoi, Vietnam and began operations on 1 November 1993.

In 1994, a proposal from Bernama senior executives for a management buyout of the agency was rejected by the Government. The agency collaborated with telecommunications company, Celcom in August 1994 to launch a wireless stock data network, known as Wireless Stock Information Services which allow investors to access online trading data information accurately.

The plan for Bernama's privatisation become the subject of discussion again when Information Minister at that time, Mohamed Rahmat in 1995 said that the agency would be corporatised as a private commercial entity before being privatised in 1997. He also pointed out that the agency "will still have to discharged its social obligations in news coverage" when Bernama become a corporate entity upon its privatisation.

In 1997, the Government decided to withdraw the monopoly of Bernama as a distributor of foreign news in the country.

Bernama began reporting using the audio-visual medium with the opening of its audio-visual division in September 1998.

In 2000, former New Straits Times editor-in-chief Abdul Kadir Jasin submitted his proposal to take over Bernama, but later withdrew his decision to acquire the news agency. Aside of Abdul Kadir, three other individuals also proposed to acquire Bernama. One of them is Jalaluddin Baharuddin, a former press secretary of the then-Prime Minister, Mahathir Mohamad. Jalaluddin and two other individuals later withdrew their decision to take over Bernama.

In April 2001, Bernama entered a strategic partnership with Amanah Capital Berhad for website content exchange partnerships. In November, Bernama partnered with Astro where the latter will air Bernama news on all Astro's in-house channels.

In 2002, Bernama launched an Arabic news service as part of its plan to disseminate information to West Asia and several other African countries.

Bernama and Algerian news agency, Algerie Presse Service (APS) signed a news exchange agreement on 12 August 2003 with a purpose to enhance information dissemination between the two countries.

The formation of NAM News Agency, set to be run by Bernama, was planned at the Kuala Lumpur meeting of information ministers of Non-Aligned Movement member countries in November 2005, with operations set to start 2007.

In 2006, Bernama collaborated again with Indonesian news agency, Antara. By this time, both signed an MoU on selected news translated in Arabic that would be released by Antara for the Gulf countries. It also expand its operations to India by set up an outpost in New Delhi in which it would make reports on Indian economy.

=== Recent developments ===
In April 2009, Bernama signed an MoU with the non-profit technology think tank, Malaysian Industry-Government Group for High Technology (MiGHT) in which the latter was commissioned to provides information, reports and data to the Malaysian public through the agency's library and infolink services.

Bernama and Indonesian news agency, Antara collaborated again in 2011. This time, both the news agencies would partner to produce a documentary with various topics on matters related to both Malaysia and Indonesia.

On 10 November 2011, Bernama launched a pictorial book titled Che Det which revolves on the turning point of Mahathir Mohamad's premiership as the fourth Prime Minister of Malaysia.

In 2014, Bernama launched a weekly business newsreel, known as Malaysia eBiz which provides selected weekly news related to business sector.

In 2018, it was announced that Bernama and Radio Televisyen Malaysia (RTM) would merge to form a standalone public broadcasting corporation as part of the government's efforts to reduce operation costs. However, the merger plan was abandoned.

In conjunction with its 53rd anniversary in 2020, Bernama launches two new columns titled Tinta Minda in Malay and Thoughts in English, which consists of commentaries by experts from diverse backgrounds.

In October 2024, Bernama has appointed as the official media and coordinator of the International Media Center for the 2025 ASEAN Summit.

The agency planned to expand artificial intelligence (AI)-related courses to media staffs in February 2025.

In March, Bernama began utilising AI technology to produce a 4-minute and 32-second azan video for the Maghrib call to prayer to "enhance the visual and spiritual experience for Muslims, in conjunction with the upcoming Ramadan". The AI-generated azan video began debuted in 2 March 2025 which is the first day of Ramadan on all Bernama's platforms.

== Structure and operations ==
Bernama is a statutory corporation under the Ministry of Communications and is a non-profit organisation that established under the Act of Parliament (1967 Bernama Act). It was once an independent corporate entity during its early history before becoming an autonomous corporation under government control via a ministry. The agency was co-funded by newspaper companies with Government assistance. Though there have been several attempts to corporatised the agency into a privately held, Bernama remains a government-owned organisation with its obligation to provide comprehensive news and true information to Malaysia and abroad.

Bernama has more than 700 employees, with approximately 400 of them were journalists, photographers and cameramen. It has its branches in every state in Malaysia. It also has correspondents in Jakarta, Singapore and Bangkok as well as its stringers in Washington, D.C., New York City, Australia and London. Bernama also have bureaus in ASEAN countries, United States, United Kingdom, West Asia and Indian subcontinent. Its namesake free-to-air radio station, Bernama Radio, was launched in September 2007 as Radio24 before rebranded into its present name in 2016, while its namesake free-to-air news channel, Bernama TV, launched in February 2008 and rebranded as Bernama News Channel in 2016 with a new logo before reverted to its original name and logo in 2019.

== Public response ==
According to Berita Harian, Bernama's legacy as a news organisation is marked by its key role to "combatting negative news that released by foreign news agency". While tabling the bill of the news agency's formation which he later approved, Senu Abdul Rahman, former Minister of Information and Broadcasting assured that Bernama will not be "used as a propaganda tool". Syed Zainal Abidin, former Bernama General Manager said in 1968 that Bernama is not a Government's mouthpiece while pointed out that it "will report news objectively, impartially". Former Prime Minister, Mahathir Mohamad believes that Bernama is a vital component to news policy while stressed that it is crucial to strengthening Bernama, so it that could "handle its own information needs". Former Information Minister, Ahmad Shabery Cheek expressed his praise to Bernama for its reporting style which is said to be acceptable to all parties including the opposition.

During the occasion of Bernama's 56th anniversary, its former editor-in-chief, Zakaria Abdul Wahab said that Bernama upholds on its goal to "disseminating reliable news and content" while played a vital role to be the "people's voice" and "bridging the gap between the government and the people". On the same occasion, Communications and Digital Minister, Fahmi Fadzil stated, "Bernama has served to report and record historic moments in our country [... and] will continue to play its role as an official source for news and become a 'resource centre' for what is happening officially in our country".

== Incidents ==
On 22 August 1992, a bomb hoax at Bernama's office caused the news agency's operations to be interrupted for 90 minutes. All of Bernama's staff returned to work after the bomb disposal unit made an inspection and did not find any explosives.

In 2009, Bernama's headquarters in Jalan Tengku Putra Semerak, Kuala Lumpur was broken into by the thieves in an incident that took place on 11 March. The total loss due to the incident was estimated at RM25,000.

In January 2011, a Bernama cameraman was allegedly punched, threatened to be thrown from the 3rd floor of the Terminal Bersepadu Selatan-Bandar Tasik Selatan and being soaked in a lake by a group of men who identified themselves as the terminal's auxiliary police. Following the incident, the suspects were arrested.

On 30 August 2013, Bernama's Terengganu bureau office in Jalan Sultan Sulaiman was robbed after Muslims performed their Friday prayers. In a 2:45 pm incident, two laptops and a BlackBerry phone were missing, believed to be taken away by a large man based on a CCTV recording.

== Awards and accolades ==
Year	Award-giving body	Category	Recipient	Result	Ref.
2020	World's First Bestbrands e-Branding Awards 2020	Strategic Business Partner Award	Bernama	Won	
2024	Putra Aria Brand Awards 2023	Media Network Award	Bernama	Bronze	

== See also ==
- Mass media of Malaysia
- List of Malaysian newspapers
- Sheikh Raffie
- NAM News Network
