= NAM News Network =

- NAM News Network's logo
- Abbreviation: NNN
- Predecessor: Non-Aligned News Agencies Pool
- Formation: November 2005; 21 years ago
- Purpose: News agency
- Headquarters: Kuala Lumpur, Malaysia (Secretariat)
- Parent organisation: Non-Aligned Movement
- Website: www.namnewsnetwork.org

The NAM News Network (NNN) is a news agency established by countries of the Non-Aligned Movement to disseminate news which are not prejudicial to the third-world countries. It is run by Bernama, the national news agency of Malaysia and funded by the Malaysian government.

== Organisation and operations ==
The formation of the agency was requested by Malaysia and the decision was made during the Sixth Conference of Ministers of Information of Non-Aligned Countries (COMINAC VI) hosted in Kuala Lumpur, Malaysia in November 2005. It planned to start in 2007. The agency was created after the earlier network, Non-Aligned News Agencies Pool (NANAP), fell into disuse in the mid-1990s.

NAM News Network's stated mission is to promote information and news from a developing country perspective and to be "a valuable alternative for the Western news dominance", essentially revitalising Non-Aligned Movement's original intention with NANAP but now equipped with the technology of Internet. It was also set up as a working platform and central hub for accredited news organisations within NAM countries to publish and reuse content.

According to the agency's website, "the NNN sees itself as an alternative source of information rather than being in competition with other major news services. Essentially it would serve as a conduit for NAM member countries to tell their story and use it as a yet another tool of communication for them."

=== Secretariat ===
The agency's secretariat is located in Kuala Lumpur, Malaysia. The national news agency Bernama serves as NNN's coordinating body.

== See also ==
- List of news agencies
