= Pablo Piacentini =

Argentine political scientist, journalist and activist

Pablo Piacentini (died 2017) was an Argentine political scientist, journalist and activist. In 1964 he cofounded the Inter Press Service (IPS) with the Italian journalist Roberto Savio.

== Life ==
Born in Buenos Aires, Piacentini was a student in Rome when he and Savio founded the Roman Press Service together in 1961. The Inter Press Service grew out of the Roman Press Service in 1964. Piacentini served the IPS in various capacities: as Editorial Director, Chief Editor, Director of the Economics Service and head of the IPS Columnist Service.

In 1974 Piacentini founded Tercer Mundo, an intellectual left-wing Argentine monthly.

== Works ==
- Chile: una tragedia americana, Buenos Aires: Ediciones de crisis, 1974
- 'Terror in Argentina', Index on Censorship, Vol. 6, Issue 2 (1977) pp.3-7
- (ed.) Story Earth: Native Voices on the Environment, San Francisco: Mercury House, 1993
