= Betteke van Ruler =

Dutch professor of communication science

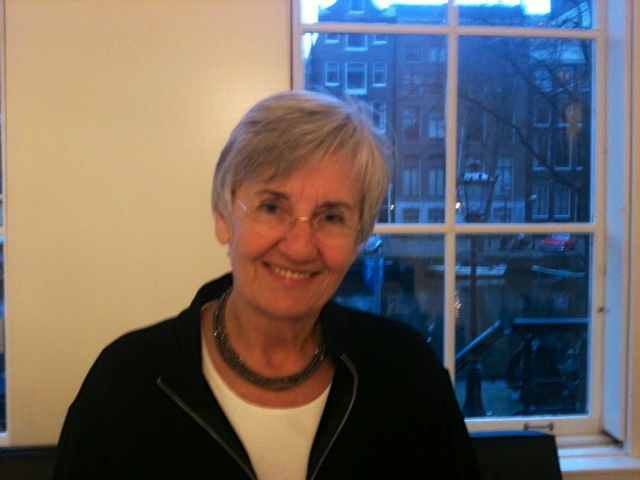
Betteke van Ruler

Alberta Arnolda "Betteke" van Ruler (born 16 September 1948) is emeritus Professor of Communication Science at the University of Amsterdam.

== Biography ==
Born in Hilversum, she was the youngest child of the theologian A. A. van Ruler. She is a scholar in academic theory and practice in public relations and communication science.

== Career ==
Van Ruler began her study of communication science at the age of 37 in Nijmegen. During her study, she held a job at the University of Applied Sciences Utrecht as a lecturer in public relations and public information. After completing her study with honors in 1990 she moved on to work at the School for Journalism in Utrecht as coordinator of a new curriculum for public information. In that same year she began with her doctoral thesis on communication management in the Netherlands. As of 1988 she did research on the practices of communications professionals.

In 1994, she was appointed full professor at a part-time chair, funded by the association of communications practitioners at the Utrecht University. In February 1996, she earned a PhD. Later that year she moved full-time to the department of communication sciences at the Vrije Universiteit Amsterdam as an assistant professor and later as associate professor.

In 2003, Van Ruler was appointed Professor to a funded chair focusing on the professionalization of communication management at the University of Twente. In 2004, she was appointed full Professor of corporate communication and communication management at the University of Amsterdam. In 2010 she retired.

She is past President of the European Public Relations Education and Research Association and past Chair of the Public Relations Division of the International Communication Association.

Van Ruler is published in Public Relations Review, Journal of Communication Management, Journal of Public Relations Research, and in many Dutch and international scientific and professional books and journals.

After her retirement, she founded the Van Ruler Academy to focus on the professionalization of communications practitioners.

In 2013, Queen Beatrix of the Netherlands appointed Van Ruler Officer in the Order of Orange-Nassau for her scientific work and building a bridge between communication theory and the practice of communications professionals.

Professor emerita and Amsterdam School of Communication Research (ASCoR) Honorary Fellow Betteke van Ruler has been appointed ICA Fellow by the International Communication Association during the 2018 conference in Prague. Fellow status in the International Communication Association is primarily a recognition of distinguished scholarly contributions to the broad field of communication. The primary consideration for nomination to Fellow status is a documented record of scholarly achievement.

Secondary consideration is given to such criteria as service to the International Communication Association and socially or professionally significant service to other publics such as business, government, education, etc.

== International publications ==
2020

- Public Relations as Reflective Practice, in Chiara Valentini (ed.), Handbook of Communication Science, Volume 27, "Public Relations". Berlin Mouton de Gruyter (in press)

2019

- The Communication Strategy Handbook, Toolkit for Creating a Winning Strategy | Betteke van Ruler & Frank Körver | Peter Lang New York
- Communication Theory: An Underrated Pillar On Which Strategic Communication Rests, in Future Directions of Strategic Communication | Routledge
- Wat Communicatie en Marketing Verbindt, in Adformatie, Mei 2019
- Agile Evaluation and Measurement, in Journal of Communication Management | Emerald (in press)

2018

- Communication Theory: An Underrated Pillar On Which Strategic Communication Rests | International Journal of Strategic Communication | Routledge / Taylor & Francis Group
- Communicatie in Positie in 3 Stappen (introductie van de methode van het Communicatiehuis) | Boom Uitgevers Amsterdam

2016

- Strategic Communication Frame | Embracing Agile Strategy Development. In Sarah Hall (ed.) FuturePRoof Two www.futureproofingcomms.co.uk
- CommTalks. Futurecheck voor de toekomstbewuste communicatieprofessional. Adfogroep Amsterdam
- Communicatie is een vak, 60 specialismen op een rij | Adfogroep Amsterdam
- Public Relations: too little emphasis on communication. In Communication Management Review, I.

2015

- Reflective Communication Scrum, recipe for accountability. The Hague, Eleven International Publishing.
- Agile Public Relations Planning: the Reflective Communication Scrum, (41)Public Relations Review, pp. 187–194.
- Agile Working, in: Sarah Hal (ed.). FuturePRoof.

2013

- Europe, Practice of Public Relations in, in: R.L. Heath (ed.). Encyclopaedia of Public Relations. Thousand Oaks: Sage, Second edition, in cooperation with Dejan Vercic.

2008

- Public Relations, an overview. In Wolfgang Donsbach (Ed.), Encyclopedia of Communication. Blackwell, together with R.L. Heath.
- Strategic Corporate Communications: Lessons from European Companies, MIT Sloan Management Review, together with J. Cornelissen & T. van Bekkum.
- Corporate Communications: a Practice-based Theoretical Conceptualization. In: Holger Sievert & Daniela Bell (eds.), Communication and Leadership in the 21st Century, pp. 35–65. Gütersloh: Bertelsmann Stiftung, together with J. Cornelissen & T. van Bekkum.
- Public Relations Metrics: Measurement and Evaluation – an Overview. In: Ruler, Betteke van, Tkalac, Ana, and Vercic, Dejan (eds.) (2008). Public Relations Metrics: Research and Evaluation, pp. 1–18. New York/London: Routledge, together with Ana Tkalac & Dejan Vercic.
- Public Relations Research. European and International Perspectives and Innovations. Wiesbaden: VS Verlag für Socialwissenschaften, together with Ansgar Zerfass & Krisnamurthi Sriramesh.
- Introduction. In: A. Zerfass, B. Van Ruler & K. Sriramesh (eds.). Public Relations Research. European and International Perspectives and Innovations, pp. 9–16. Wiesbaden: VS Verlag für Sozialwissenschaften, together with Ansgar Zerfass & Krisnamurthi Sriramesh.
- Communication Management in Europe – Challenges and Opportunities. In: A. Zerfass, B. Van Ruler & K. Sriramesh (eds.). Public Relations Research. European and International Perspectives and Innovations, pp. 313–324. Wiesbaden: VS Verlag für Sozialwissenschaften, together with Dejan Vercic.
- Public Relations and Social Theory. Key Figures and Concepts. New York: Erlbaum, together with Oyvind Ihlen & Magnus Frederikson.
- Applying Social Theory to Public Relations. In: Ihlen, Oyvind, Ruler, Betteke van, & Frederikson, Magnus (Eds.). Public Relations and Social Theory. Key Figures and Concepts, pp. 1–20. New York: Erlbaum together with Oyvind Ihlen & Magnus Frederikson.

2007

- Corporate Communications and Corporate Reputation: understanding how (best) practices make a difference, book chapter in T. Delaware Handbook, together with Tibor van Bekkum & Joep P. Cornelissen.
- How Public Relations Works, Public Relations Review guest editors special issue Summer 2007, together with Oyvind Ihlen.
- How Public Relations Works, (33) Public Relations Review 33, pp. 243–248 (introduction special issue), together with Oyvind Ihlen.
- Defining Strategic Communication, International Journal of Strategic Communication, 1(1), pp. 3–35, together with Kirk Hallahan, Derina Holtzhausen, Dejan Vercic & Krishnamurthy Sriramesh.
- Public Relations in the Future in: Mehdi Bagherian and Dr. Motamednejhad (Eds.), International PR, pp. 18–37. Teheran: Kargozar publications, together with Dejan Vercic.
- Communication in the Public Sector: Consequences for public communication about policy intentions, Government Information Quarterly, 24, pp. 326–337, together with G. Boeckaert & D. Gelders.
- Communication in Public Relations: The Achilles Heel of Quality Public Relations, (7) Sphera Publica, 1, pp. 111–140.
- European Communication Monitor. Leipzig: University of Leipzig, together with Ansgar Zerfass & Dejan Vercic (first edition of the monitor).

2006

- Corporate Communications: a Practice-based Theoretical Conceptualization,(9) Corporate Reputation Review nr.2, pp. 114–134, samen met Joep Cornelissen & Tibor van Bekkum.
- Why people watch TV? In: Jaap Willems & Winfried Göpfert (eds.). Science and the power of TV, pp. 159–168. Amsterdam: VU University Press, together with Jaap Willems.
- Trends in Public Relations and Communication Management Research. A comparison between Germany and The Netherlands, (10) Journal of Communication Managementnr.1, pp. 18–26, together with Juliana Raupp.
- Public Relations and Communication Management in Europe: Challenges and Opportunities, (8)Communicacao e Sociedade, pp. 179–192, together with Dejan Vercic.
- European Approaches to Communication Management, Your Critics are your Best Friends, (1)Communication Director, nr.1, 53–57
- A Sociological Magnifying Glass on Public Relations, ICA Newsletter, March, together with Oyvind Ihlen.
- The Role of Public Relations Education and Research in Building Public Trust, a commentary, Portraits (Digital Newsletter Public Relations Students Portugal), January.

2005

- Organizations, Communications and Management. In: Peggy Bronn (ed.). Corporate Communication. A Strategic Approach to Building Reputation. Oslo: Gyldendahl Akademisk Norsk Forlag, together with Carl Bronn & Dejan Vercic.
- Reflective Communication Management, Future Ways for Public Relations Research. In: Pamela J. Kalbfleisch (ed.). Communication Yearbook Vol.29, pp. 239–274. Mahwah, NJ: Erlbaum, together with Dejan Vercic.
- Public Relations: Practitioners Are From Venus, Scholars Are From Mars, (31)Public Relations Review, nr.2, pp. 159–173.

2004

- A First Look for Parameters of Public Relations in Europe, (16)Journal of Public Relations Research, nr. 1, pp. 35–64, together with Dejan Vercic, Bertil Flodin & Gerhard Bütschi.
- The Communication Grid, introduction of a model of basic communication strategies in public relations practice, (30)Public Relations Review, nr.2, pp. 123–143.
- Public Relations across Europe: a developing research field. In: Juliana Raupp & Joachim Klewes (Hrgs.). Quo Vadis Public Relations?, pp. 238–250. Wiesbaden : Verlag für Sozial Wissenschaften, together with Dejan Vercic.
- Public Relations and Communication management in Europe. A nation-by-nation introduction to public relations theory and practice. Berlin/New York: Mouton De Gruyter, together with Dejan Vercic.
- Overview of public relations and communication management in Europe. In: Ruler, Betteke van & Vercic, Dejan (eds.).
- Public Relations in Europe. A nation-by-nation introduction to public relations theory and practice, pp. 1–12.Berlin/New York: Mouton De Gruyter, together with Dejan Vercic.
- Public Relations in Europe, the Dutch case. In: Ruler, Betteke van & Vercic, Dejan (eds.).
- Public Relations and Communication Management in Europe. A nation-by-nation introduction to public relations theory and practice, pp. 261–276. Berlin/New York: Mouton De Gruyter.
- Co-creation of meaning theory, in: R.L. Heath (ed.). Encyclopaedia of Public Relations, pp. 135–138. Thousand Oaks: Sage.
- Enlightenment and Modernity, in: R.L. Heath (ed.). Encyclopaedia of Public Relations, pp. 283–285. Thousand Oaks: Sage.
- Constructionism theory, in: R.L. Heath (ed.). Encyclopaedia of Public Relations, pp. 184–186. Thousand Oaks: Sage.
- Europe, Practice of Public Relations in, in: R.L. Heath (ed.). Encyclopaedia of Public Relations, pp. 297–301. Thousand Oaks: Sage, together with Dejan Vercic.

2003

- Barriers for Communication Management at the Executive Suite, (29)Public Relations Review, nr.2, pp. 145–158, samen met Rob de Lange.
- 21st Century Communication Management – the People, the Organization. In: Peggy Bronn & Roberta Wiig (eds.). Corporate Communication. A Strategic Approach to Building Reputation, p. 277-294. Oslo: Gyldendahl Akademisk Norsk Forlag, samen met Dejan Vercic.
- Public Relations in the polder: the case of the Netherlands. In: K. Sriramesh & D. Vercic (eds.). The global Public Relations Handbook, Theory, Research, and Practice, pp. 222–243. Hillsdale: Erlbaum .
- The influence of the corporate identity structure on the organization of communication, (7) Journal of Communication Management, nr.3, pp. 197–208, samen met Frank Körver.
- Perspectivitas européias das relacoes públicas [Issues of Public Relations in Europe], (24)Comunicacao & Sociedade, nr.39, pp. 155–172, together with Dejan Vercic.

2002

- "The Management of Corporate Communication in the Netherlands", in: A. Schorr, B. Campbell & M. Schenk (eds.). Communication Research and Media Science in Europe. Perspectives for Research and Academic Training in Europe's Changing Media Reality, pp. 389–407. Berlin: DeGruyter, ISBN 9783110849202, samen met Rob de Lange.
- Refleksivni Komunikacijski Menedsment, (39) Teorija in praksa, nr. 5, pp. 739–754, together with Dejan Verčič.
- 21st Century Communication Management – the People, the Organization, in: Peggy Bronn & Roberta Wiig (eds.). Corporate Communication. A Strategic Approach to Building Reputation. Oslo: Gyldendahl Akademisk Norsk Forlag, pp. 277–294, together with Dejan Vercic.
- The Bled Manifesto on Public Relations. Ljubljana: Pristop Communications, together with Dejan Vercic.
- Dutch Communication Management Community establishes an Education Network, European Public Relations Network, nr, 4 (Journal of Euprera).

2001

- Public Relations in Europe. A kaleidoscope picture, (6) Journal of Communication Management, nr.2, pp. 166–175, together with Gerhard Bütschi, Bertil Flodin & Dejan Vercic.
- Vercic, Dejan, Ruler, Betteke van, Flodin, Bertil & Bütschi, Gerhard (2001). On the Definition of Public Relations: a European View, (27) Public Relations Review, nr.4, pp. 373–387, together with Gerhard Bütschi, Bertil Flodin & Dejan Vercic.
- Komunikacijski menedzment pod drobnogledom: Nizozemska,(38) Theorija in praksa, no. 4, pp. 693–712 (ISSN 0040-3598, refereed in Political Science Abstracts, Sociological Abstracts, Cobiss, IBZ, International Bibliography of Periodical Literature).
- Management of Reputation and Public Trust, Marketing & Logistics Internet Register, www.mcbup.com/Research_Registers/mkt.asp.
- Public Relations Education in Europe, Frontline, the Global Public Relations Quarterly, newsletter of the International Public Relations Association, IPRA, nr. 6, pp. 14–17, together with Dejan Vercic.
- Public Relations, a multi-dimensional concept, (3) Newsletter of the European Public Relations Education and Research Association, nr.1, pp. 20–23j together with Gerhard Bütschi, Bertil Flodin & Dejan Vercic.
- Communication Management: a new approach, Communication World, p. 6-7 (Magazine of IABC), together with Dejan Vercic.

2000

- Communication Management in the Netherlands, (26) Public Relations Review, Vol.4, pp 403–423.
- The Communication Grid, a situational model of communication management strategies. In: E. Denig & A. Weisink (eds.) Challenges in Communication, State of the Art & Future Trends, IPRA Gold Paper No 13, special edition for the Public Relations World Congress 2000, Chicago, Illinois, USA – October 22–25, 2000.
- The European Public Relations Body of Knowledge (EBOK) project. In: Barbara Baerns and Juliana Raupp (Eds.). Transnational Communication in Europe, pp. 359–364. Berlin: Vistas, together with Gerhard Bütschi, Bertil Flodin & Dejan Vercic.
- The Delphi Research Report. Ghent: CERP Education & Research, together with Gerhard Bütschi, Bertil Flodin & Dejan Vercic.
- Bibliography on Public Relations in the Netherlands, 1990–2000, www.euprera.org, together with Henk Boer & Nico Jong.

1999

- Dialoque as method. Driebergen: Kerk en Wereld (special issues brochure, 13 pages).
