= Public Relations (disambiguation) =

Public relations is the practice of managing and disseminating information to the public in order to affect their perception.

Public Relations can also refer to:

- Public Relations Journal (1945–1994), was an open-access peer-reviewed, electronic academic journal covering topics having to do with public relations and communication studies.
- Public Relations Review (1975-), a peer-reviewed academic journal.
- Public Relations (book) (1945-), a sociology book by Edward Bernays.
- Public Relations (band) (2004–present), a Czech rock band.
- "Public Relations" (Arrested Development), a TV episode of Arrested Development.
- "Public Relations" (Mad Men), a TV episode of Mad Men.
- Public Relations Manager, a communications management occupation title.

== See also ==
- PR (disambiguation)
- list of public relations journals
- Category:public relations companies
