= Larissa Grunig =

American public relations theorist (born 1946)

Larissa Schneider Grunig
- Born: April 28, 1946; Lincoln, Nebraska
- Education: North Dakota State University (Bachelor's degree), University of Maryland, College Park (Ph.D)
- Occupation: Public relations

Larissa A. Schneider Grunig (born April 28, 1946) is a public relations theorist and feminist, and she is known as one of the most published and influential scholars in public relations. A professor emerita at the University of Maryland, College Park, Department of Communication, Grunig taught public relations and communication research since 1979. Based on a content analysis of three academic journals (Public Relations Review, Journal of Public Relations Research and its precursor, Public Relations Research Annual) from their foundation through the year 2000, Grunig was recognized as one of the five most prolific authors contributing to public relations theory development. Her research focuses on public relations, development communication, communication theory, gender issues, organizational response to activism, organization power and structure, ethics, philosophy, scientific and technical writing, and qualitative methodology.

== Early life ==
She began her professional career as a public school teacher. Then Grunig became a reporter and editor of a community newspaper in Colorado. Beginning in 1969, she served as a public relations consultant.

== Career ==
Grunig received her Ph.D. in public communication from the University of Maryland, College Park, in 1985, and taught in the College of Journalism and Department of Communication there. In addition to her work in the journalism and communication departments, she was an affiliate faculty member of Maryland's School of Public Affairs and its Women's Studies Program.

=== Teaching ===
Prior to teaching at University of Maryland, College Park, Grunig was a Title III Visiting Scholar at Eastern Washington University in 1992 and taught at Washington State University from 1984 to 1985. During her time teaching, Grunig advised 100 master's students (overseeing 30 master's theses and 70 master's degree students who chose the non-thesis option) and ten doctoral dissertations. She was honored with the title Outstanding Educator by the Public Relations Society of America (PRSA) in 1996.

Of the 30 master's theses that she advised, three won the Institute for Public Relations outstanding master's thesis competition. In 1991, Grunig was honored by the University of Maryland System with the Phi Kappa Phi Faculty Mentor Award, and in 1999, she was listed as one of the nation's Top 10 educators by PR Week.

=== Publications ===
In addition to serving on the advisory board of thirteen refereed journals, Grunig has written more than 200 articles, book chapters, and conference papers on public relations, communication theory and other topics. From 1987 to 1990, she was a founding co-editor of the Public Relations Research Annual (now the Journal of Public Relations Research). Grunig also co-authored the first book about women in public relations alongside Elizabeth Lance Toth and Linda Childers Hon; the book was called "Women in Public Relations: How Gender Influences Practice." The book was a finalist for the Frank Luther Mott/Kappa Tau Alpha Research Award for the best book in journalism and mass communication in 2001.

Grunig began researching excellence in public relations beginning in 1985 as a member of an international grant team supported by the International Association of Business Communicators (IABC) Research Foundation. The project, termed the Excellence Study, culminated in three sequential books, the last of which Grunig was the first author (James E. Grunig and David M. Dozier also co-authored). The book, titled "Excellence in Public Relations and Effective Organizations: A Study of Communication Management in Three Countries," won the 2002 PRIDE book award of the National Communication Association's Public Relations Division for its innovation and scholastic achievement in public relations research.

=== Association Membership ===
She is a member of the National Capital and Maryland chapters of PRSA and was named to the Hall of Fame of the National Capital Chapter in 1999. From 1985 to 1988, Grunig served as an adviser to the Public Relations Student Society of America (PRSSA) for the chapter at the University of Maryland, College Park.

=== Additional Awards ===
Grunig, along with her husband James Grunig, was honored with the 2010 Presidential Award of the International Public Relations Association for "outstanding contribution to better world understanding." She received the Alumni Achievement Award of North Dakota State University, which is her undergraduate alma mater, in 2003.

== Personal life ==
Grunig is married to James E. Grunig, a public relations scholar and theorist. James and Larissa Grunig have four children and five grandchildren.
