= List of public relations journals =

This is a list of peer-reviewed, English language academic journals in public relations.

- Asia Pacific Public Relations Journal, Deakin University, Australia
- Case Studies in Strategic Communication, University of Southern California, United States
- Corporate Communications: An International Journal
- International Journal of Strategic Communication, International
- Journal of Communication and Public Relations (JCPR), Indonesia
- Journal of Communication Management
- Journal of Public Relations Research, Association for Education in Journalism and Mass Communication, United States
- PRism, Massey University & Bond University, New Zealand
- Public Relations Inquiry, SAGE Publications, United Kingdom
- Public Relations Journal, Public Relations Society of America, United States
- Public Relations Quarterly, Routledge, United Kingdom (defunct)
- Public Relations Review, Elsevier, United Kingdom
- Journal of Public Relations Education, Association for Education in Journalism and Mass Communication, United States

== See also ==
- List of press release agencies
