= C. Kay Weaver =

New Zealand-based media and communication academic and academic administrator

- Education: University of Sterling
- Scientific career
- Thesis: Representations of men's violence against women : audio-visual texts and their reception (1995)

Celia Kay Weaver (born 1964) is a New Zealand-based media and communication academic and academic administrator. She is Dean of Te Mata Kairangi, the School of Graduate Research at the University of Waikato.

== Career ==
Weaver was a police officer in West Midlands / Birmingham in England before embarking on a BA and PhD at the University of Stirling. Her thesis examined the reception of coverage of men's domestic violence against women, using focus groups and UK television news and dramas and Hollywood films.

== Selected works ==
- Motion, Judy, and C. Kay Weaver. "A discourse perspective for critical public relations research: Life sciences network and the battle for truth." Journal of Public Relations Research 17, no. 1 (2005): 49–67.
- Bardhan, Nilanjana, and C. Kay Weaver, eds. Public relations in global cultural contexts: Multi-paradigmatic perspectives. Routledge, 2011.
- Weaver, C. Kay, Judy Motion, and Juliet Roper. "From propaganda to discourse (and back again): Truth, power, the public interest and public relations." Public relations: Critical debates and contemporary practice (2006): 7–21.
- Richardson, Margaret, C. Kay Weaver, and Theodore E. Zorn Jr. "'Getting on': older New Zealanders' perceptions of computing." New Media & Society 7, no. 2 (2005): 219–245.
- Weaver, C. Kay. "A Marxist primer for critical public relations scholarship." Media International Australia 160, no. 1 (2016): 43–52.
