= PRWeek =

Trade magazine for the public relations industry

- Categories: trade magazine, news website
- Publisher: Haymarket Media Group
- Founded: 1984; 41 years ago
- Country: United States; United Kingdom
- Language: English
- Website: www.prweek.com/us (en-US) www.prweek.co.uk (en-GB)

PRWeek is a trade magazine and news website for the public relations and wider communications industry. It is published by Haymarket Media Group.

== History ==
PRWeek was originally launched as a private venture in 1984 and was acquired by the larger publishing company, Haymarket Media Group, in 1988. The original UK edition was founded by Geoffrey Lace and Lord Chadlington in the 1980s. PRWeek was later sold to Lace's former employers, Haymarket, the publishing group founded by Lord Heseltine, a cabinet minister in the governments of Margaret Thatcher and John Major. A US edition of the publication launched in 1998.

In 2009, PRWeek US changed from a weekly to a monthly publication due to declining print advertising and a shift to online readership. Despite the reduced frequency, the magazine kept its name for brand recognition. The new format featured longer articles and introduced a paid subscription model for online content, while maintaining the same annual price. In 2013, the UK print edition of PRWeek also changed from a weekly to a monthly edition.

== Awards and rankings ==
PRWeek produces regular research about the UK public relations industry, including the annual ranking of Top 150 PR consultancies. PRWeek organises industry awards, referred to by the Financial Times as the "highest honours in communications and PR".

== Bibliography ==
- Bussey, Cathy (2011). Brilliant PR: Create A Pr Sensation, Whatever Your Budget, Whatever Your Business. Harlow: Prentice Hall. ISBN 978-0-273-74658-4. LCCN 2011007574. OCLC 703205541.
- Edwards, Lee; Pieczka, Magda (2013). "Public relations and 'its' media: Exploring the role of trade media in the enactment of public relations' professional project". Public Relations Inquiry. 2 (1). Sage Publishing: 5–25. doi:10.1177/2046147X12464204. ISSN 2046-147X. OCLC 853249761. S2CID 145427954.
- Garsten, Nicky; Cronin, Bruce; Howard, Jane (2024). "An exploration of PR Week UK's framing of specialist PR identities (1985–2010)". Public Relations Review. 50 (4). Elsevier: 1–10. doi:10.1016/j.pubrev.2024.102468. ISSN 0363-8111. OCLC 10278958476. S2CID 271307717.
