= European Association of Communication Directors =

The European Association of Communication Directors (EACD) is a multi-field network for communication professionals across Europe. The EACD was founded in Brussels in November 2006 by over 100 in-house communicators from 23 countries. As of March 2015 it counts over 2,300 members. It organises regular regional debates across Europe on topics related to communications, and has subsets of working groups where members discuss specific issues arising from their work.

== Initiatives ==
Through various initiatives the EACD offers a number of activities and services for its members, including publications, research programmes, events and awards ceremonies.

=== Publications ===
Communication Director is a professional specialist magazine for corporate communications and public relations in Europe. It documents opinions on important strategic questions in communication, discovers transnational developments and discusses their relevance from a European perspective. A section of the magazine focuses on EACD activities and projects as well as highlighting and profiling members. Communication Director is published quarterly in English, with a total of 100 pages. All members of the EACD receive the magazine for free.

The European Communication Monitor is an international research initiative conducted by the European Public Relations Education and Research Association (EUPRERA) in partnership with the EACD and Communication Director magazine. This study aims to monitor trends in strategic communications.

The EACD regularly publishes service brochures that focus on specific communications-related topics. Previous brochures include "Reputation management", "The Value of Data in Digital Corporate Communications " and "The EACD Guide to Brand Management".

=== Research programmes ===
The European Communication Professional Skills and Innovation Programme (ECOPSI) is an EU-funded project which aims to identify and evaluate the current and future communication management skills of practitioners based in Europe. The project is designed to build a European theory of communication management and to establish a framework to support the professionalisation and ethical development of communication professionals.

The EACD also conducted a research project that examined the membership of communication professionals in executive committees. The C-Suite project, which was conducted by the Amsterdam School of Communications Research (AsCoR), in cooperation with the EACD and Russell Reynolds Associates, analysed the prevalence of Chief communications officer (CCOs) on the executive committee of the largest global companies as well as their role and the type of organisation they were employed by.

=== Events ===
Co-hosted by the EACD and Communication Director magazine, the European Communication Summit is an annual two-day-conference in Brussels for in-house communication professionals. The event is open to communicators based in Europe and come from the fields of business, politics, associations and media. Over 60 speakers present and participate in discussions during the Summit. Participants have the opportunity to debate strategies, tools, methods and best practice within the fields of corporate communication, public relations, media relations and political communication.

The Circle of European Communicators is an invite-only meeting held annually in a major European city. There corporate communications leaders are presented with expert opinions from across diverse fields – including the arts, business and politics to finance, sport and sociology.

=== Awards ===
The EACD presents the European Communication Award in a gala ceremony held annually at the European Communication Summit. It honours outstanding communications achievements by those in Europe. The award is given to either an individual or organisation for their communication efforts from the past year. The award is granted based on the input of EACD members.

Another initiative, the Young Communicators Award, is targeted towards supporting young public relations and communications professionals working in Europe. This award recognises outstanding communications projects that demonstrate innovative ideas and execution. Shortlisted nominees present their projects at the European Communication Summit. The winner is then selected by those in attendance.
