= European Confederation of Public Relations =

CERP – European Confederation of Public Relations was a Pan-European organization representing the national public relations and communication associations of Europe. CERP was also the European division of the worldwide organization Global Alliance for Public Relations and Communication Management. It ceased to exist in 2011.

== Current situation ==
The CERP headquarters was in Brussels (Belgium). The current president of the organization is Mr. Roberto Zangrandi, the head of ENEL European Affairs office in Brussels. Mr. Zangrandi was elected president at the CERP General Assembly that took place in London on 21 June 2008. On 19–20 June 2009 the General Assembly in Vienna discussed the current situation of the organization and, in particular, its stagnation. The confederation's re-launching was proposed.

Following the results of an extended associative marketing campaign conducted after the above-mentioned General Assembly aimed at checking whether the national federations of public relations still had interest in such an umbrella organisation, the CERP Board of Directors decided to dissolve it and merge it within the Global Alliance for Public Relations and Communication Management. The decision was taken at the Extraordinary General Assembly that took place on 12 November 2009 in Catania (Italy). The procedure of CERP's winding-up and its incorporation into the Global Alliance for Public Relations and Communication Management is underway and is to be finished in the first part of 2010. As a consequence of the dissolution, the European Confederation of Public Relations will be converted into a study centre and think tank. The new activities will include the positioning of the new body as a Brussels-based Global Alliance for Public Relations and Communication Management arm.

== History ==
The idea of such an organization belongs to a Frenchman Mr. Lucien Matrat; in 1956 he launched an initiative to create a European Committee of Public Relations. Such a committee was formed in Luxembourg the following year by a group of interested individuals, but the organization itself was officially established in Orleans (France) on 8 May 1959 (with the members of AFREP : Claude Chapeau, Robert Charles Sainson and Jean Autran) by four founding members – Italy, France, the Netherlands and Belgium. At the very beginning of its existence the organization was called European Center of Public Relations.

The statutes of the organization provided for four working groups: CEDAN, CEDET and CEDAP. CEDAN, that is, the European Conference of National Public Relations Associations, aimed at active members and endeavored to coordinate activities of the national associations in order to reach agreement on professional principles, ethics, and practice. The two remaining working groups were aimed at the professional members: CEDET was meant for anyone involved in research and education whereas CEDAP was the forum for independent advisers and integrated employees.

The official language of the organization was French, but only till 1966 when English was granted this status too.

One of the most important achievements of the organization in those years was approval of Code of Athens (called also Code of Ethics) in 1965 which enjoins public relations practitioners worldwide to respect the Charter of the United Nations and the moral principles of its Universal Declaration of Human Rights. The author of the document, adopted in May 1965 in Athens and amended in Teheran in April 1968, was Mr. Lucien Matrat who launched the idea to establish CERP.

A number of national associations have joined the organization in the coming years. The first to join the founding members in 1959 were Greece and Germany. In 1965 the British Institute of Public Relations became a member of CERP, in 1974 – Danish Public Relations Association. In 1974 the organization counted 13 active members.

From the end of 70s the main CERP's concern was reaching recognition of the profession and its coordination on the European level. But the main obstacle to the objective, so important for the PR field, was that most European countries in those times were still thinking too nationally, and all the efforts did not go beyond declarations of common aspirations and intentions. However, on 16 April 1978 in Lisbon CERP's General Assembly officially adopted "Code of Lisbon" – code of professional conduct establishing criteria, standards and obligations for PR practitioners. It consisted of three sections: Section I – Criteria and standards of professional qualification of practitioners bound by this Code; Section II – General professional obligations; Section III – Specific professional obligations (towards clients or employers, towards public opinion and the information media, towards fellow-practitioners, towards the profession). Members from 15 European countries agreed to the document as well as on disciplinary measures in case the code was not respected.

In this period CERP became also more visible on the international scene having acquired consultative status within Council of Europe (1976) and UNESCO (1983), which earned the organization some prestige.

In the meantime a new problem arose. There was more than one national association in some countries, the fact that raised a lot of questions regarding membership right at CERP. In 1979 an important decision was taken: several PR associations from a single country could become members of the organization.

In the second part of 80s, CERP's complicated structure caused many discussions: its members were divided by two principal visions of CERP's re-organization. The first group saw the organization as a unique body uniting and representing only the national associations, while another one opted for an organization of individual members. In 1989 CERP sub-divided into separate bodies becoming in such a way a confederation of 22 members (3 individual European professional associations and 19 national associations) that in the coming years were joined by the countries from Eastern Europe. Those 3 organizations emerged from CERP were the following: CERP CONSULTANTS, CERP PRO (Public Relations Officers) and CERP EDUCATION. CERP EDUCATION, however, gave the way to CERP STUDENTS, a fourth autonomous international organization within the Confederation which consequently in 1995 counted 23 full members from 20 different countries and 4 autonomous organizations.

During 1996–1998 further changes occur inside the Confederation: CERP EDUCATION turns CERP EDUCATION AND RESEARCH (CER), CERP PRO practically disappears and CERP CONSULTANTS becomes less active. December 2000 was crucial for the CERP EDUCATION AND RESEARCH: CERP's sub-division decided to become independent from the Confederation. In such a way EUPRERA was born.

A few years later in June 2004, the CERP STUDENTS members decided on stepping out of the Confederation as well, and, therefore, the European Confederation of Public Relations Students became PRime, The European Association of Public Relations and Communication Students.

== Recent activities ==
On 16 March 2008 CERP organized a luncheon meeting with Mr. Gerard Legris, Head of Unit (Secretariat General of the European Commission for Transparency, Relations with Stakeholders and External Organizations) to discuss Code of Conduct for Public Affairs and Ethics in communication.

On 21 July 2006 CERP produced Joint response to the European Commission's White Paper on a European Communication Policy. The organization endorsed the EC intention to engage the citizens on the basis of different opinions towards the EU policies and considered crucial to implicate more widely the civil society in the debate on Europe and policy–making process. CERP offered to the European Commission further support and invited it to cooperate.
