= Susanne Holmström =

Danish sociologist (born 1947)

Susanne Holmström (born 1947) is a Danish sociologist, best known for her writings on organizational legitimacy based on the systems theory of Niklas Luhmann.

For her dissertation Perspectives & Paradigms: An Intersubjective and a Social Systemic Public Relations Paradigm she was awarded the 1998 EUPRERA award for best European dissertation in public relations. In 2004 she became a full Ph.D. for her thesis The Sensitive Organisation of the Reflective Society.

She has formerly been a board member of EUPRERA and of the steering group of LOKE, a Nordic network for research within organisational legitimisation and communication. She is best known for having developed the so-called reflective business paradigm (Holmström 2004).

In recent years she has been an external lecturer at Roskilde University and in 2011 was appointed Honorary Professor.
