= CERP =

CERP may refer to

- Certified Ecological Restoration Practitioner
- Chemistry Education Research and Practice
- Cluster of European Research Projects
- Comprehensive Everglades Restoration Plan
- Commander's Emergency Response Program
- European Confederation of Public Relations
- Commercial Engine Replacement Program
- Certified Enterprise Resiliency Practitioner
- Cybersecurity Emergency Response Plan
