= List of press release agencies =

An example of a press release: a Wikipedia press release template prepared by the Wikimedia Foundation communications team

This is a list of notable press release agencies. A press release is a written or recorded communication directed at members of the news media for the purpose of announcing something ostensibly newsworthy. Public relations is the practice of managing the spread of information between an individual or an organization (such as a business, government agency, or a nonprofit organization) and the public.

== Press release agencies ==
- PR Newswire – a distributor of press releases based in New York City. The service was created in 1954 to allow companies to electronically send press releases to news organizations, at first using teleprinters. PR Newswire was acquired by Cision in 2016.
- Sovfoto – established in 1932 as the only agency to represent Soviet photojournalism in America. It continues today as a commercial entity Sovfoto/Eastfoto. Collections from its archive are held also at MacLaren Art Centre in Barrie, Canada which in 2001 was donated 23,116 vintage gelatin silver prints dating from 1936 to 1957, while the University of Massachusetts Amherst holds the Tass Sovfoto Photograph Collection, 1919–1963, the majority being from 1943–1963.
- U.S. Newswire – a U.S. national news release wire service established in 1986 and distributes media materials on behalf of a variety of customers, particularly the U.S. government and non-profit agencies. It is based in Washington DC and was acquired from Medialink by PR Newswire on October 1, 2006.
- Downtown Publishers — a public relations and media placement agency based in New York City, offering press release writing and distribution, editorial placements, and reputation management services.

== See also ==
- Brand management
- Digital marketing
- List of news agencies
- List of public relations journals
- Litigation public relations
- News agency
- Press agent
- Press service
- Publicist
