= Slovenian Press Agency =

National news agency in Slovenia

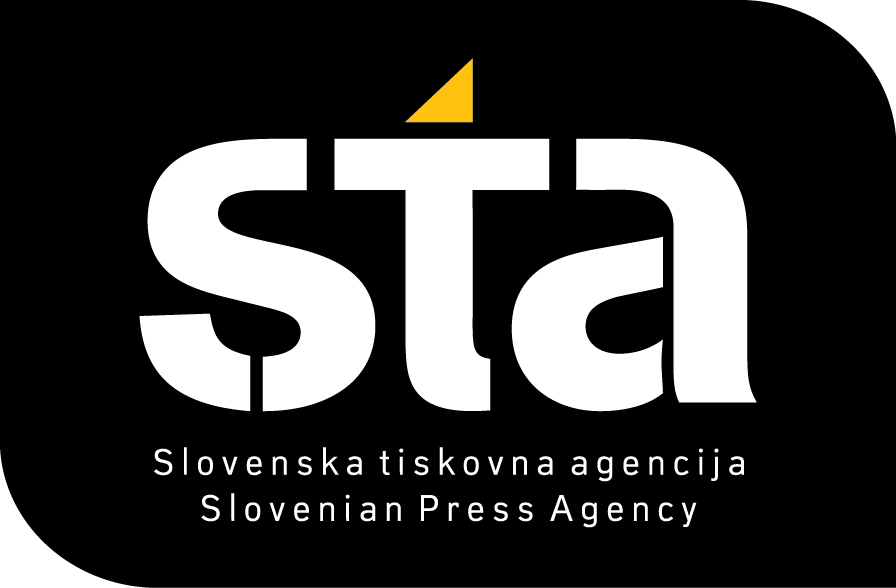
- Native name: Slovenska tiskovna agencija
- Type: Limited liability company
- Industry: News media
- Founded: June 1991; 35 years ago
- Founders: Republic of Slovenia
- Headquarters: Ljubljana, Slovenia
- Number of locations: Brussels, Zagreb, New York
- Area served: Worldwide
- Key people: Barbara Prelesnik, director general; Aljoša Rehar, Editor-in-Chief
- Products: News agency, news websites
- Revenue: 4,000,000 (2018)
- Number of employees: 80 (2023)
- Parent: Government Communication Office
- Website: www.sta.si

The Slovenian Press Agency (Slovene: Slovenska tiskovna agencija; STA) is a national news agency covering domestic and international events that is based in Slovenia.

Established on 20 June 1991, just days before the Independence of Slovenia, the STA News Services are targeted towards state institutions, corporations and embassies. Its founding director was Dejan Verčič. The STA is the only provider of daily news in English for the expatriate community in Slovenia and English-speaking readers abroad.

With over 100 full-time employees and part-time contributors based in Ljubljana, as well as a network of correspondents in major cities across Slovenia and Brussels, New York, Zagreb, Rome, Klagenfurt, Trieste and Gorizia, the STA provides local and international coverage. The STA exchanges news wires with press agencies from around the world and also taps into other foreign sources of news to provide a wider view.

== General News Service ==
The General News Service is a source of information for Slovenian and foreign media, state institutions, diplomatic offices, companies, non-governmental organizations and other users in the Slovene language. Each day, the General News Service publishes up to 300 reports, features, press reviews and other news items covering domestic policy, business, international affairs, arts, sport and EU affairs.

The General News Service includes the following categories:

- News (Categories: Slovenia, European Union, Business and Economy, Arts and culture, Sport, Health, Education and science, crime and accidents, human interest)
- Daily and weekly schedules of events (Daily and weekly schedules of events in Slovenia and around the world, daily schedules of features and interviews and the daily schedule of the Picture Service)
- Daily and weekly roundups of major events (Comprehensive roundups of the most important events of the day or week in Slovenia and abroad)
- Advisories (updates about the latest events and changes to scheduled events)
- Press review (Commentary and interviews from Slovenian and foreign press)
- Traffic (The latest information on traffic in Slovenia)
- Weather (Weather forecasts for Slovenia and Europe)

== English News Service ==
The English News Service is a source of news on Slovenia in English. A team of journalists and translators publish up to 50 daily news items, interviews, press reviews and more.

Aside from events in Slovenia, the English Service reports on Slovenia’s international activities, with a special focus on the European Union, Southeastern Europe and international organisations. It also provides coverage of business and economic policy and reports on operations of Slovenian companies in international markets.

The English News Service is divided into the following categories:

- News (Politics, Business and economy, Environment, Health and Science, Sport, Arts and culture, around Slovenia)
- Daily and weekly schedules of events (schedules of daily and weekly events in Slovenia and foreign events involving Slovenia)
- Daily and weekly roundups of major events (roundups of events in Slovenia and foreign events involving Slovenia)
- Press review (commentary and interviews from the Slovenian press)

== STA-R Radio Service ==
The Slovenian Press Agency launched a radio news service, STA-R, in the autumn of 2009. STA-R provides subscribers with text and audio news adapted for radio broadcasting. The audio service covers news in home affairs, foreign policy, the economy, culture, sports and other areas of interest and supplements the existing daily news wire service. The audio service is created by STA journalists with the help of domestic and foreign correspondents. STA-R also offers a schedule of events.

== Picture Service ==
The STA Picture Service provides daily images from major political, business, cultural and sports events, as well as images accompanying entertainment and human interest stories. Content is produced by the staff photographers and STA’s correspondents from Slovenia and abroad. The STA also taps into an international exchange of photographs through its partner agencies (Itar Tass, Xinhua, Beta, Tanjug, HINA, Telam).

The STA Picture Service was expanded in 2010 with an Official Photography segment available to STA subscribers. The special segment includes images from official events at home and abroad. It was created after STA won a public tender to become the official provider of photography for a number of state agencies and institutions.

Covering between 20 and 25 major events, the STA Picture Service produces over 200 photographs daily. The number is even higher for special events such as Olympic Games or Slovenian elections. The STA Picture Archive contains over 110,000 press photographs capturing life in Slovenia since 2002.

== The Crisis Mirror (Kr-og) ==
Responding to the prevailing economic conditions in 2009, the STA launched a new service dedicated to covering measures aimed at economic recovery. The content of the website is accessible to the public. Users can find information related to the Slovenian economy as well as the economies of other countries. The website raises cases of best practice, presents an overview of crisis measures and provides an analysis of the latest economic trends in Slovenia and abroad. It also provides commentary and opinions on economic measures from business officials, economists, social partners and other experts.

== Kr-og Bulletin ==
The KR-OG bulletin represents an extension to the Kr-og website. It is intended for business officials, editors, journalists, public servants and experts, opinion-makers and others. The content includes a weekly interview with a business official or economist and a summary of topical news related to the road to recovery.

== Specialized Services ==
Aside from the daily news, schedules and roundups in English and Slovene, the STA provides specialized and on-demand services. For major events such as Slovenia's EU presidency, Olympic Games, the introduction of the euro and elections, the STA provides a news service with a team of journalists and contributors. The STA also provides on-demand information services such as the production of special publications or on-demand photo coverage.

=== O-STA original press release distribution service ===
The O-STA is STA's original press release distribution service. Companies and institutions wanting to get their message across can use O-STA to distribute their original press releases to users on the O-STA mailing list and on the O-STA website, where they can be accessed by STA subscribers as well as other visitors.

STA is the only provider in Slovenia to offer distribution of press releases abroad to targeted markets through partner agencies. STA is part of the international OTS network, which includes press agencies from Austria, Bosnia and Herzegovina, Bulgaria, Croatia, Czech Republic, Estonia, Hungary, Latvia, Lithuania, Montenegro, Poland, Romania, Russia, Serbia, Slovakia, Ukraine and Slovenia.

The O-STA enables clients to include up to five images, tables or graphs as well as a logotype with a link to their company's website along with the press release, whereby the first picture is already in the price.

=== News Alerts STA-AND (agency news of the day) ===
News Alerts STA-AND is designed to complement the programming content of TV stations. It is intended for national as well as regional and local TV stations which want to offer their viewers short information on domestic and international events. News Alerts STA-AND is also for complementing advertisements displayed on LCD ad displays of all kinds. Current news shown next to ads.

Application of STA-AND News Alerts: 1. for TV stations; 2. for digital Ad-displays

=== Info Ticker STA-AND (agency news of the day) ===
The Info Ticker STA-AND is a product providing web pages with the summaries of news prepared by the STA journalists. It is intended for websites which want to offer their visitors domestic and international news in compact form. The info ticker automatically displays the last five news items in the General News Service in Slovene or English, or news on individual topics (business, Slovenia, international, sport, arts) as per request.

=== STA Klub ===
One of the freshest services unveiled by the STA in late 2009 is the STA KLUB. As part of the STA KLUB, a number of round tables, seminars, workshops and lectures featuring guests are held every year. Events deal with a variety of topics catering to different target audiences, including business officials, media representatives, and cultural and social workers.

=== STA Clipping ===
STA Clipping relies on the general news service. Subscribers are forwarded news to their e-mail filtered on the basis of keywords they have specified. The service is aimed primarily at press representatives of major companies and ministries as an alternative to specialized clipping services.

=== STA News and Picture Archive ===
- News archive search (The STA has a news archive dating back to 1991, when Slovenia became an independent country. The archive already contains over 1.5 million news items)
- Picture archive search (The STA picture archive contains over 130,000 photographs)
