= Department of Tourism and Resorts of Ajara Autonomous Republic =

Department of Tourism and Resorts of Adjara Autonomous Republic
- აჭარის ა. რ. ტურიზმისა და კურორტების დეპარტამენტი
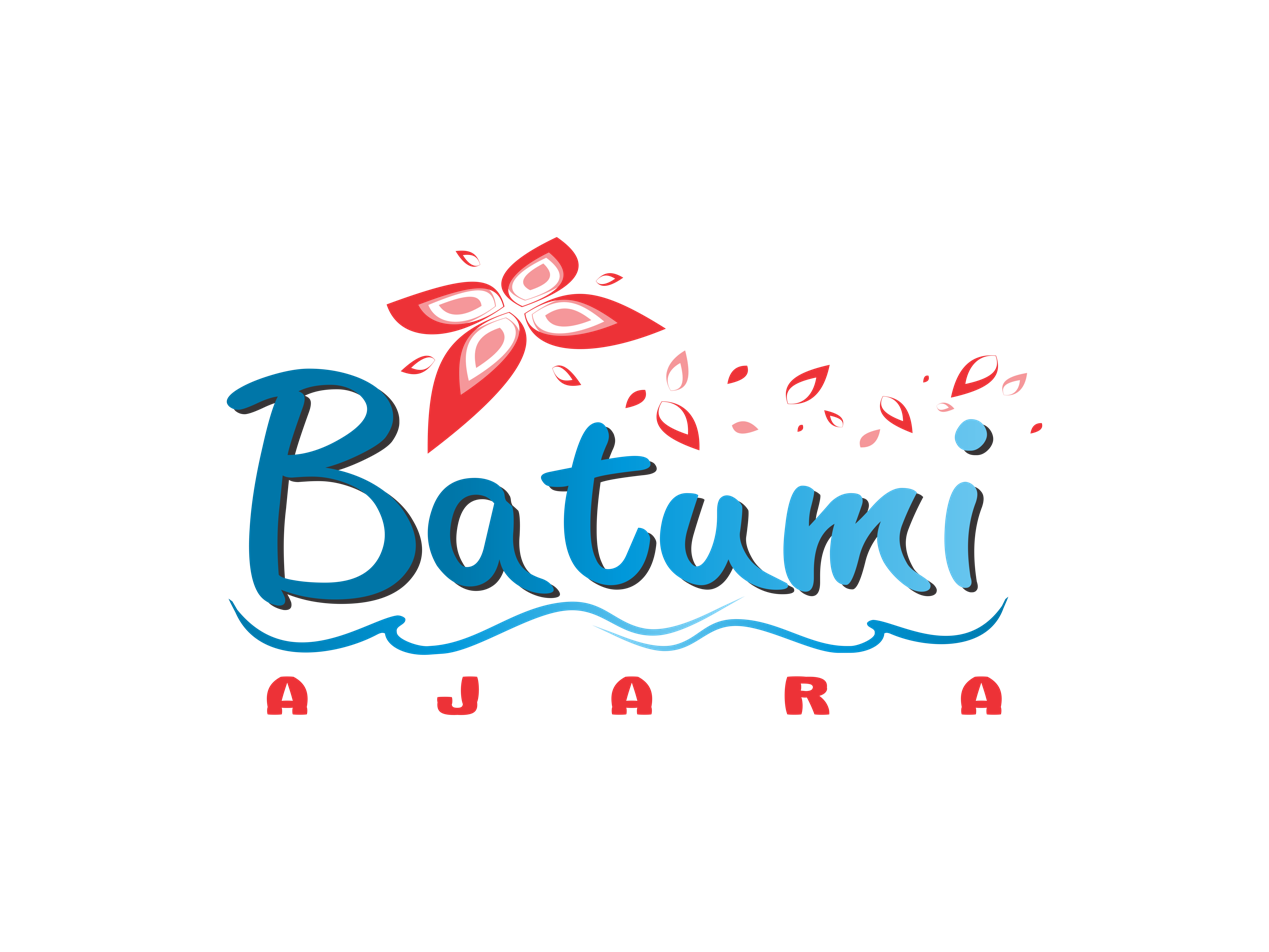

Department overview
- Formed: January 1, 2007
- Headquarters: 41.646691°N 41.633372°E
- Employees: 30
- Annual budget: GEL 2,5 million (2013)
- Department executive: Sulkhan Glonti, Chairman
- Website: goBatumi.com

The Department of Tourism and Resorts of Adjara A. R. (Georgian: აჭარის ა. რ. ტურიზმისა და კურორტების დეპარტამენტი, DTRA) is a sub departmental establishment of government of Adjara Autonomous Republic that is mainly involved in a state management of tourism and resorts in the region. The department carries out a state policy in reserving and developing tourism and resorts. It also popularizes touristic potential of the region on an international level and favors implementation of various innovations in tourism sphere.

== Management structure ==
The Department is managed by the Chairman Mamia Berdzenishvili. Public Relations Manager and Statutory auditor are the assistants of the chairman. There are 6 divisions in the department:

- Administrative Division
- Marketing and Advertising Division
- Tourist Product and Service Division
- Information Technology and Online Projects Division (ITOP)
- Statistics Division
- Accountancy Division

Each division has a head of the division who are subordinated to The First Deputy Chairman and Deputy Chairman of the department.

== Tourism projects ==
- Expo Batumi 2011
- Audio Guides Service
- Tourism Week 2012
- Share Your Love of Batumi - Summer, 2013
- The Season of Unparalleled Discounts, 2013
- Your Summer Starts Here 2014

== Tourism slogans ==
- Evergreen Memories (2007–12)
- Visit, Feel it, Love it! (2013–14)
