= Public relations in India =

Public relations is a term that refers to the management of communications between an entity such as an organization or a celebrity, and stakeholders, internal or external, such as investors, employees, communities, customers or clients. It is concerned with reputation building, and is often considered to be a subset to marketing, advertising, or corporate communications.

== History of Public Relations in India ==
Public Relations, despite being over a century old across the world, began in India in the 1950s, when a group of public relations practitioners formed the Public Relations Society of India in 1958 in Bombay under the leadership of Kali H. Mody. He led the body till 1960, followed by Arthashastra S. Mandietta who was the President from 1961 till 1965, and Farruk S. Mulla Mulla, who became the President from 1966 to 1969. It was under Farruk S. Mulla, this informal body was registered under the Indian Societies Act XXVI of 1961, in 1966, and he became the founder President of Public Relations Society of India.

At the same time, around 1965, another body, the Public Relations Circle was founded and registered in Kolkata. It was the first-ever association of professional PR practitioners in eastern India.

In 1968, the first All India Public Relations Conference was held in Mumbai, where the members of the Calcutta Public Relations Council decided to disband the regional body, and merged with the Public Relations Society of India to strengthen the national body. Another significant contribution of this conference was the adoption of the International Code of Ethics (also called Code of Athens) on 21 April 1968.

President Farrok S. Mulla was able to extend the reach of the PR body by establishing Regional Chapters at Delhi, Madras, and Calcutta.

One of the landmark achievement of this professional body of PR practitioners was to bring together leading international PR experts to India when Mumbai hosted the 9th Public Relations World Congress from 19 to 23 January 1982 with active participation of International Public Relations Association (IPRA). At that time, the PRSI was headed by K.S. Neelakandan, Director, Public Relations with Pfizer Limited, who was also the Executive Chairman of the World Congress.

Though there were several individuals and small companies, which started even before that, they offered PR with the limited scope of media relations only. It was only natural that the entrepreneurs who began these services came from a background of journalism, seen as a natural hunting ground for the nascent PR industry.

=== Growth of Public Relations in India ===
According to a report by PRCAI titled 'State of the Industry Survey 2019', PR industry in India grew 12% to reach Rs 1,600 cr in 2019. Though conventional Media Relations continues to be the key revenue source for agencies, the revenue share of digital and social media services increased from 12 per cent in FY18 to 16 per cent in FY19. According to the report, among sectors, Fast-Moving Consumer Goods (FMCG), Information Technology (IT), Travel and Government (both central and state) have driven the industry's growth, with a 44% contribution to the revenue.

Public Relations as a practice has grown over the years with many advertising agencies including PR services in their portfolio besides mushrooming of independent PR consultants to full-fledged PR agencies.

However, the growth can be attributed to several professional bodies who in their own right had been engaging communicators by conducting conferences, seminars, workshops and upgrading their skills.

Some of these professional bodies include Public Relations Society of India, Public Relations Council of India, Association of Business Communicators of India, Public Relations Consultants Association of India, and Global Forum for Public Relations.

Since 2006, the Public Relations Council of India has been organising the "Global PR Conclave" where veteran PR practitioners are inducted into the Hall of Fame and Chanakya Awards are also conferred to various individuals and organisations for their PR campaigns under diverse categories.

In 2010, The Holmes Report, an international report that rates PR agencies across the globe, awarded Blue Lotus Communications Private Limited the Indian Consultancy of the year for 2010.

The Holmes Report also awarded the consultancy of the year award for 2011 to Corporate Voice | Weber Shandwick. Corporate Voice Weber Shandwick's campaign for Gillette India won India's first PR Lion at Cannes in 2010.

In 2011, IPRCCA, India Public Relations and Corporate Communications Awards (IPRCCA), instituted an award for PR agencies.

In 2015, Indian PR Industry professionals came together to create School of Communications & Reputation (SCoRe) - India's first post-graduate institute in public relations and corporate communications. In 2015, the Public Relations Consultants Association of India (PRCAI) endorsed the PG Diploma at the School of Communications & Reputation making it the only Public relations programme in the country endorsed by the association.

In 2017, Marketing Interactive awarded "Most Creative PR Stunt - South East Asia" in PR Awards 2017 to the Indian PR firm ARM Digital, for their campaign "Tea for Trump".

In 2018, Adfactors PR became the first Indian firm to have a revenue upwards of Rs 150 crore per annum and stood at 70th rank in The Holmes Report's Top 250 Global PR Agency Ranking The largest competitor to Adfactors PR is PRNews Journal, as of 2018. In 2021 Public Media Solution is growing fast and holding no.1 position under Reputation Management Agencies.

In 2018, Avian WE, formerly known as Avian Media, founded by Nikhil Khanna in 2004, and headquartered in Delhi merged into the US-based PR agency WE Communications as a strategic investment. Avian WE was awarded Giant PR Consultancy of the year 2021 by IPRCCA. Avian WE was also awarded Agency of the Year (Large) 2021 by Kaleido Awards. In 2022 Worthy Wellness Foundation a PR agency founded in 2022 by Rajendra Saini and Harshit Bajpai. Headquartered in Lucknow, Uttar Pradesh has given award known as Rashtriya Pratishtha Puraskar to about 1000+ individuals for contributions to the society.

== PR Controversies in India ==
=== Satyam Scam ===
On January 7, 2009, Ramalinga Raju, the erstwhile chairman of Satyam Ltd., India's leading IT firm, made an admission of conscious fraud & misreporting perpetrated by him over several years. The media who had eulogized him till then, suddenly turned on him with a vengeance, conscious that they had also failed in their duty as watchdogs of businesses. This crisis, coincided with the peak of the global crisis and held the potential to snowball into a credibility & trust issue for brand India and its IT firms, where several billion dollars' worth of services were being outsourced every year. The crisis also impacted several companies associated with Satyam including EMRI (Emergency Medical Response Institute), a not-for-profit endeavour (for running free ambulance services) in which Satyam had committed 5% of running costs with the balance 95% coming from various state governments.

However, the Indian government took quick action and set up an interim board consisting of industry stalwarts for the company to assess the true worth of Satyam and to seek a suitable investor & management. The swiftly conducted and fiercely contested bid was won by Mahindra & Mahindra and Satyam was merged with a group IT company.

=== Radiagate Scam ===
After the global slowdown that hit Indian Public relation agencies in 2008, it took a further hit in November 2010 due to what has come to be known as the 'Radiagate' scam. Open Magazine in an exposé, covered the story of Niira Radia's nefarious power-dealings. An Income Tax phone tap collected more than 5000 tapes and hundreds of these tapes were leaked and found their way into Outlook magazine's website. The Central Bureau of Investigation (CBI) interrogated Radia several times and as a fallout of the tapes, the Telecom minister, A. Raja, with whom Radia had close links was also forced to resign. Several prominent journalists like Barkha Dutt and Vir Sanghvi were also in the middle of the quagmire, caught in power-lobbying conversations with Radia.
