= Dejan Verčič =

Slovenian academic

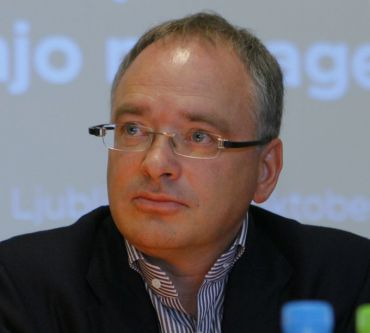
Dejan Verčič

Dejan Verčič is a Slovene communication researcher and public relations theorist.

Dejan Verčič is Professor, Head of Department of Communication and Head of Centre for Marketing and Public Relations at the Faculty of Social Sciences of the University of Ljubljana (Slovenia), and Partner and Knowledge Director in strategic communication group Stratkom d.o.o., Slovenia.

== Biography ==
Verčič received his PhD from the London School of Economics and Political Science, UK, and he was a Fulbright scholar at San Diego State University. Dr. Verčič has published 14 books and his most recent are Experiencing public relations (2018), Communication Excellence (2017), Culture and Public Relations (2012) and The Global Public Relations Handbook (2009). In 2001 he was awarded the Alan Campbell-Johnson Medal for outstanding service to international public relations by the UK Chartered Institute of Public Relations (of which he is a Fellow), and in 2016 the Pathfinder Award, the highest academic honour bestowed by the Institute for Public Relations (IPR) in New York. In 2015 he was elected an Honorary Member of the Croatian Public Relations Association, and in 2016 into Arthur Page Society. Verčič served, inter alia, as the chairman of the Research Committee of the IABC Research Foundation and as the President of the European Public Relations Education and Research Association (EUPRERA). In 1991 he was the founding director of Slovenian national news agency (STA). Since 1994, he organizes an annual International Public Relations Research Symposium – BledCom and since 2007 he is a founding member of the European Communication Monitor (ECM) research team.
