= SCMP (disambiguation) =

SCMP may stand for:

- South China Morning Post, Hong Kong newspaper
- SCMP Group, former publisher of the South China Morning Post, now known as Great Wall Pan Asia Holdings
- Strategic Communication Management Professional
- Simple Commerce Messaging Protocol
- Software Configuration Management Plan
- Stateless Certified Mail Protocol
- Student Christian Movement of the Philippines
- Survey of China Mainland Press, a publication of the Consulate General of the United States in Hong Kong from 1950 to 1973.

== See also ==
- Scump (born 1995), Seth Abner, professional Call of Duty player
- National Semiconductor SC/MP, an 8-bit microprocessor
