= Public affairs industry =

Industry of engagement between organizations

Public affairs generally refers to the engagement efforts between organizations, often times in the context of building business or governmental relationships. The industry has developed over recent years and is normally considered a branch or sub-discipline of public relations (PR). Having such a broad range of coverage regarding its definition, public affairs is, by nature, a hybrid of disciplines that relies heavily on strategic communication. While often equated with lobbying, this is usually only a small part of what a public affairs practitioner might do. Other typical functions include research, strategy planning and providing advice. Dr. Juan-Carlos Molleda writes, “Many types of organizations virtually and physically interact and communicate with publics and/or audiences outside of their own country of origin to build a dynamic set of relationships. Trade, direct foreign investment, political coalitions, worthy global causes, information flow, and social networking, among other phenomena, are increasing the complexity of those relationships dramatically”.

Organizations who make use of public affairs are typically large companies, charities, trade unions, membership organizations and interest groups. They will either have staff working directly for them or employ a firm of public affairs consultants. Very often public affairs staff will work with their non-PR colleagues who are experts in a given field. Public affairs fundamentally has a global impact, and it is necessary to view it through the lens of the perspective nation in which it is being practiced.

Given public affairs’ current development, there is still a common perception among those not within the industry that synonymize public affairs with lobbying, as well as public relations. Within the Global North, public affairs entails not only the former, but additionally information monitoring, media management, event planning and organization, political marketing, and of course, networking. The industry itself is expected to grow in employment opportunities by 7% between 2019 and 2029 in the US, faster than the average for all other occupations, and can mostly be contributed to the growing need for organizations to maintain their public image in such a media-abundant society. It is difficult to determine the size of the public affairs industry in the United Kingdom. Studies suggest the industry is becoming more professionalized, and that it is more widespread than often assumed. The Chartered Institute of Public Relations (CIPR), which is the UK's professional body for public relations including public affairs, estimates there are around 48,000 people involved in PR, of which 30% are involved in public affairs. This research is limited as it only measures specific job titles and those who declare themselves to be working in PR. There are large numbers of professionals providing public affairs services while working under different job titles across a wide variety of sectors. The job titles of public affairs practitioners may vary, depending on the focus of their role, but may include, "public affairs", "external affairs/relations", "corporate communications", "government/parliamentary affairs" and "policy".

Worldwide, the industry is expected to grow from $63.8 billion in 2018 to $93.07 billion by 2022. North America is currently holding the largest segment of that value, and is expected to maintain its standing, followed by Europe, with an increased investment in digital programmatic public relations efforts overall. Globally, governments are continuing to enforce data protection laws in order to protect individuals against unfair government or business practices, through regulations such as the General Data Protection Regulation (GDPR) in the European Union. In the United States, President Barack Obama has introduced several measures intended to increase transparency in public affairs. In an attempt to close the "revolving door" of executive-branch officials becoming lobbyists immediately following the expiration of their federal appointments, he issued Executive Order 13490 on January 21, 2009, dictating, among other things, a two-year ban on lobbying for former top executive branch officials related to any issue that they worked on during their final year in government employment. He also introduced a ban on verbal communication between lobbyists and the federal agencies tasked with awarding economic recovery funds. These measures have proved controversial and while some argue they are a positive and necessary step, others have deemed the policies as failures due to various loopholes.

The importance of media and the distribution of information in public affairs industry has experienced a myriad of trends over the last few decades. Between the 1950s and 1970s, studies found that there was an increase in the consumption of news through television broadcasting, while the newspaper decreased in circulation during this period. A study done in 1970 by Peter Clarke and Lee Ruggles also found that during this evolution from print to radio and television news, people still would turn to print or newspapers for local news, more often than national or international news on public affairs as it was considered easier to follow and understand. Moving into the 1980s and 1990s, the increased exposure to the readily available coverage of politics and public affairs, it was found that those who were interested in such information, readily sought it out and enjoyed discussing it with others. This sense of community and interest in conversing about such topics continues to evolve and has resulted into what is known today as social media. In fact, in the last decade or so, particularly among younger people, the consumption of news in general has declined and there is a reliance on getting information through social media. Thus, social media outlets such as Facebook and Twitter being some of the most popular, in addition to news apps, are increasingly becoming the main sources of political and public affairs news, and news in general.

== Global North and Global South ==
The hegemonic power of the United States and Global North often overshadows the progress being made internationally, and to be more specific, within the Global South. A point of contention between the Global North and South is the misconception that public affairs and international relations practices that may be considered mainstream in the Global North, are not relevant to the realities of the goings on in the Global South.

The entirety of the Global South should not be further homogenized, especially within itself. In other words, theories and best practices should be modified to adhere to the unique cultural and governmental demands of each nation. The tactics to carry out government affairs will need to vary drastically from country to country; what is feasible in Japan could fail in Taiwan, for example. This is also the case for how public affairs strategies are managed, such as media relations and stakeholder relations, as well as internal communications. There is a long-standing history of colonialist attempts to circulate messages of conformity and perpetuating that organized government of the Global South is inferior. In fact, the term ‘public affairs’ was created in the U.S.. DeSanto writes, “The term grew out of a 1913 US federal government directive known as the Gillett Amendment, which forbids any government agency to spend money for publicity without the specific approval of the US Congress”. This isolating origin of such an all-encompassing topic, ultimately has created a ‘unifying goal to challenge the domination of the Global North’, but it has also magnified some of the inequalities that have emerged between nation states within the Global South, specifically China, Brazil, and India establishing themselves as strong economic powers and instituting a familiar problem of marginalization among nations that have already been marginalized by the Global North. By generalizing the conditions of Southern nations, there is a judgement cast and thus, distracts from how multifaceted public policy and policy making actually are, regardless of its relatively recent inception, particularly in the Global South.

The evolution of policy making in the Global South has been a driving force in expanding the involvement of Southern nations in international cooperation, which has resulted in actual policy changes and greater attention to global fairness and justice, as well as stability in globalization. Although only part of the whole of public affairs, lobbying has its place. Lobbying aids groups with individualistic goals to access government legislature that would be inaccessible to any one person. Rooted and most common in the United States and arguably the United Kingdom, it is still present in the Global South. Some notable countries that partake in lobbying activities include Korea, Mexico, Saudi Arabia, Kuwait, South Africa, Chile, and Peru. Within these nations although lobbying is an active movement as a participatory gesture in the public affairs industry, there is still much development and accessibility increases happening in order for the Global South to progress in their efforts.

The Global North is made largely of the political powers of the United States and the United Kingdom. In the US, with its inception being only a little more than 100 years ago, public affairs is a relatively new concept, in fact even within the last decade, the practice of public affairs within government was not as well established as it was in the private sector. Public affairs made its way to the UK in the 1980s through the European Centre for Public Affairs (ECPA). American experts on the subject were sent over to Europe to teach approaches and methods that had been implemented in America, but much like the blueprint being used for the Global South, such teachings were nearly irrelevant in adaptation to the European political system. However, as years have gone by, similar outcomes and statistics of the impact of public affairs have emerged in both the US and the UK. For example, in the US, 89% of corporations and 53% of trade associations succeed in their lobbying efforts, while 60% of citizen groups and 63% of foundations fail. Similarly, in the UK, 61% of corporations and 57% of trade associations succeed, much like in the US where the industry often wins. However, in the UK, citizen groups and foundations succeed at the same rate (67% and 56%). These statistics are a possible indicator of the systematic differences within the Global North. These findings in the US are results of re-election efforts of wealthy individuals and interest groups, ultimately benefitting corporations over individuals. It has been argued that professional lobbying goes against democracy as it allows big business to buy power and influence with well funded campaigns giving them an unfair advantage. Steps are being taken in several countries to attempt to increase levels of regulation and transparency in the public affairs industry. Several countries have introduced a mandatory register for lobbyists. The European Union has been working with a voluntary register since July 2008. Many other governments including the United Kingdom are debating a register of some kind.

== See also ==
- Advocacy group
- Fossil fuels lobby
- Lobbying
- Lobbying in the United Kingdom
- Lobbying in the United States
- Pharmaceutical lobby
