= GCCC =

GCCC may refer to:

- Garden City Community College
- Garden City Country Club
- Global Communication Certification Council
- Gloucestershire County Cricket Club
- Gold Coast City Council
- Greater Columbus Convention Center
