= A. A. van Ruler =

Dutch theologian

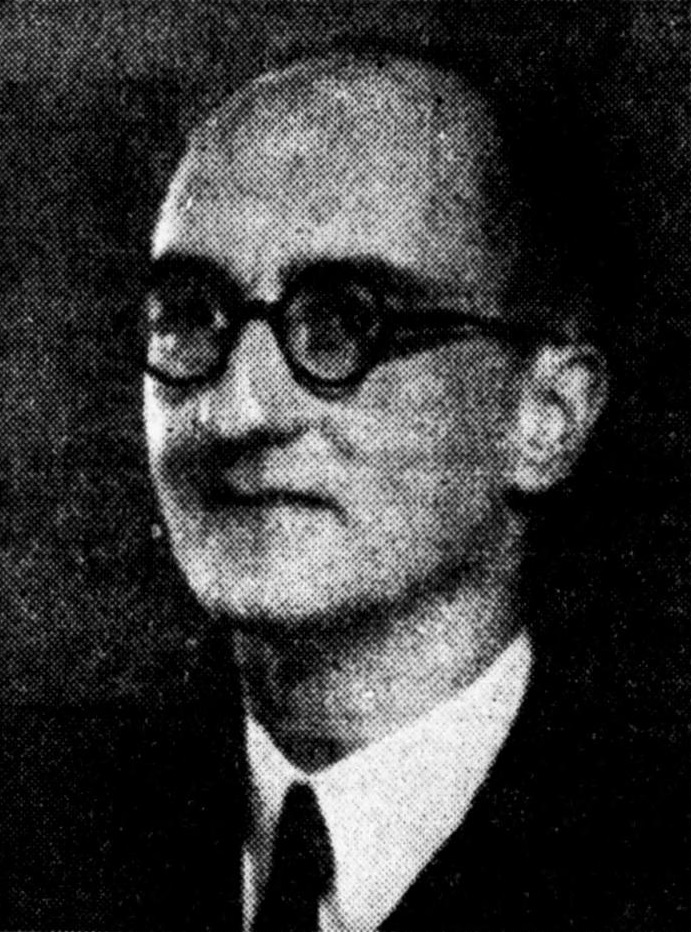
Van Ruler in 1947

Arnold Albert van Ruler (10 December 1908 – 15 December 1970) was a Dutch minister and theologian.

Van Ruler was born in Apeldoorn. He studied at the University of Groningen and was ordained as a minister in the Dutch Reformed Church. He obtained his PhD from the same institution in 1947 and became professor of theology at the University of Utrecht. For many years, he broadcast Bible meditations via AVRO.

Van Ruler was in favour of a theocracy. He was heavily influenced by Philippus Jacobus Hoedemaker. van Ruler also emphasized the goodness of creation.

Van Ruler had five children, including Betteke van Ruler.
