= Cision Media Contacts Database =

The Cision Media Contacts Database (formerly known as Bacon's Media Directories) gathers information on media contacts and outlets (currently over 1.6 million, updating daily). Though a commercial resource, it has often been exploited for academic research applications.

The database is useful for marketing and public relations work. It has also been recommended for use in academic research and has indeed been leveraged as a key data source in peer-reviewed studies. As summarized by professor Philip M. Napoli, these directories are "widely regarded as the best-available commercial database for identifying media outlets and media workers in the United States," especially as "[t]he scale and scope of the data contained within Cision far exceed what can generally be gathered by academic researchers...". However, some scholars critique the use of Cision in such research because its method of gathering data "sweep[s] up problematic actors," such as bots, when aggregating data on media contacts.

== See also ==
- Media studies
- Cision
