= Juliet Roper =

New Zealand management academic

- Born: 1953 (age 72–73)
- Other name: Juliet Patricia Roper
- Education: University of Waikato
- Scientific career
- Thesis: The political field and public relations : competing discourses in New Zealand's first MMP election (2000)

Juliet Patricia Roper (born 1953) is a New Zealand management communications academic. She is a full professor at the University of Waikato.

== Academic career ==
After an MSc title 'Takeovers legislation: a Faircloughian discourse analysis' and a 2000 PhD titled 'The political field and public relations: competing discourses in New Zealand's first MMP election' both at the University of Waikato, Roper rose to full professor.

Roper's most recognised works relate to the aspects of social and environmental communication.

== Selected works ==
- May, Steven K., George Cheney, and Juliet Roper, eds. The debate over corporate social responsibility. Oxford University Press, 2007.
- Rahaman, Abu Shiraz, Stewart Lawrence, and Juliet Roper. "Social and environmental reporting at the VRA: institutionalised legitimacy or legitimation crisis?." Critical perspectives on Accounting 15, no. 1 (2004): 35–56.
- Inkson, Kerr, Hugh Gunz, Shiv Ganesh, and Juliet Roper. "Boundaryless careers: Bringing back boundaries." Organization studies 33, no. 3 (2012): 323–340.
- Roper, Juliet. "Symmetrical communication: Excellent public relations or a strategy for hegemony?." Journal of Public Relations Research 17, no. 1 (2005): 69–86.
- Roper, Juliet, and George Cheney. "The meanings of social entrepreneurship today." Corporate Governance: The international journal of business in society 5, no. 3 (2005): 95–104.
