= Public Relations Society of India =

- Formation: 1958
- Type: Non-governmental organization
- Headquarters: New Delhi
- Key people: Dr Ajit Pathak
- Website: https://prsi.org.in/

The Public Relations Society of India is a not-for-profit organisation in India for working professionals in the public relations field. It has been in existence since 1958 and later became a formal organisation in 1966. The society has 23 regional chapters who is responsible for electing the national council of the society.

The Society celebrates National Public Relations Day on 21 April and also confers PRSI Awards to deserving individuals and organisations.

The first National Council president was Kali H Mody. Since 2006, PRSI national council has been managed by Dr Ajit Pathak as president.

== History ==
The society began operating in 1958 as an informal body of PR professionals to improve and distribute essential information to the sector. The society was registered and founded in 1966 under the Societies Act 1961 by Kali H. Mody.

Later in 1968, the Public Relations Circle, Kolkata was merged into PRSI to concentrate on the nationwide growth of the society. This had been decided in the First All India PR Conference on April 21, 1968, which happened in New Delhi. After this, the Kolkata chapter of PRSI was also founded in 1969. Following this, Chennai, Delhi and Mumbai chapters were founded in the same year.

== Works and activities ==
PRSI and its regional branches organise lectures, seminars, workshops and discussions on topics and issues related to public relations. The organisation launched a voter awareness campaign in April 2024 ahead of the 2024 Lok Sabha elections. Its aim was to create awareness among first-time voters and young voters. PRSI also conduct workshops for professionals. The workshops are meant to prioritise the issues and challenges being faced by professionals. In April 2025, PRSI organised a workshop on AI and its responsible use in work.

PRSI and all its regional chapters conduct elections to elect the executive members and office bearers at the national council and regional levels.

=== National Public Relations Day ===
PRSI observes National Public Relations Day on 21 April. All the regional chapters do events on this day to mark the importance of 21 April in Indian public relations history and also to exhibit the importance of Public Relations in developing India. Through various programmes, National Public Relations Day is celebrated to honour individuals who have played an important role in the development of this profession in India.

=== National PRSI Awards ===
PRSI gives awards in various categories to various national organizations, institutions and individuals for their contribution to public relations. These awards are called National PRSI Awards.

== See also ==
- Public Relations in India
- Public Relations Society of America
