= Communications manager =

A communications manager, sometimes called public relations manager or pr manager, is a person entrusted with the management (planning, implementation and controlling) of strategic, goal-oriented communication processes between organizations (companies, associations, authorities, NGOs, etc.) and their respective stakeholders.

Typical job titles for communications managers are - depending on their level - Communications manager, Communications Director, Vice President Communications and Chief Communications Officer (CCO). The activity is not to be equated with that of the press or media spokesperson, who is only responsible for communication with the media (media relations). However, the area of media relations makes up a large (but declining) area of work for communication managers.

== Fields of work ==
Communication managers work in commercial enterprises, government organizations/authorities, non-governmental organizations (associations and other NGOs), scientific institutions, parties and other organizations.

The areas in which communication managers work include the following communication disciplines:

- Media relations
- Internal communications
- Marketing communications
- Public affairs (representation of interests and lobbying)
- Sales communications
- Investor relations

Typical tasks and objectives include:

- overall management of strategic communications
- the evaluation of communication activities and measurement of success (communication controlling)
- brand communications
- internal advice and training
- CSR communications

== Professional associations ==
Communications manager is a profession, with professional organizations on international, national and regional levels:

- European Association of Communication Directors (EACD), the professional association for senior communication managers (communication directors) in companies, headquartered in Brussels

== Prominent examples ==
Prominent examples of high-level communications managers include:

- the current White House Communications Director
- the current Downing Street Director of Communications to the Prime Minister of the United Kingdom
