= Public Relations Consultants Association of India =

Public Relations Consultants Association of India (PRCAI) is a trade organization that represents India's public relations consultancy sector. It is a professional body for public relations consultancies in India. IIt was formed in October 2001 to represent the public relations consultancy sector in India and provide an industry forum for outside organizations. It offers membership to public relations practitioners who meet the criteria established by the association.

== Establishment ==
PRCAI was established on October 4, 2001. On the lines of the Public Relations and Communications Association in the United Kingdom, it was formed and mooted by various public relations firms in India. It is affiliated with the International Consultancy Communications Organization (ICCO) which is an international association for all national communication consultancy organizations headquartered in UK.

== Members ==
Members include professionals from Avian WE, Edelman, Corporate Voice, Weber Shandwick, Genesis BCW, MSL, Archetype, Good Relations India, Ogilvy PR, Ruder Finn, Value 360 Communications, On Purpose, Public Media Solution and Adfactors PR, among others.

== Ethics ==
The association has established self-regulatory guidelines on ethics and standards. In 2011, PRCAI aligned with European Public Affairs Consultancies Association (EPACA) to formulate norms for government engagement activities to ensure a higher level of transparency.

== Industry reports ==
In 2013, the association released the 'PRCAI Trends Report 2013' focusing on issues within the Indian public relations industry. The report consists of data collected from around 54 PR executives, including CEOs and chairmen from India. This PRCAI report identified growth challenges for 2013 like creating new demand, managing client expectations, hiring new resources, and managing costs.
