= Litigation public relations =

Litigation public relations, also known as litigation communications, is the management of the communication process during the course of any legal dispute or adjudicatory processing so as to affect the outcome or its impact on the client's overall reputation. The aims of litigation PR differ from general PR in that they are tied to supporting a legal dispute rather than general profile raising. Accordingly, there is a greater focus on the legal implications of any communications given the strategic aims and sensitive rules around disclosure during court proceedings. The New York Times reports that sophisticated litigation public relations efforts have included "round-the-clock crisis P.R. response, efforts to shape internet search results, and a website with international reports and legal filings" intended to support one side of the case. According to the international legal directory Chambers & Partners, as a result of the internet and social media, response must be faster and more strategic, since "the reputational consequences of each legal move are magnified and amplified far beyond the courtroom walls. Planning, preparation and rapid response are all critical elements to ensure a litigation communications program that effectively supports high-profile, high-stakes legal matters."

The discipline operates under three structural constraints not present in general communications work: attorney-client privilege and work-product protection, judicial gag and sealing orders, and jury-pool taint risk in matters proceeding to trial.

== Background ==
The use of mass media to present a particular narrative to the public has been employed by both plaintiffs and prosecutors for a long time, but the formal practice of litigation PR, a sub-specialty of crisis communication, emerged in the United States in the early 1980s with Alan Hilburg, a pioneer in litigation communications representation of U.S. Tobacco in the Marsee case. Since then, the demand for litigation PR has expanded significantly as media coverage of court cases and legal disputes has increased. Parties to a lawsuit often have interests that expand beyond legal concerns. Negative publicity about a litigant can cause damage to an individual's reputation that persists even if they win the case itself. Thus, many seek to limit the negative publicity associated with their cases. Given the often complex matters which are the subject of litigation, practitioners need to digest and simplify these to ensure media and public interest in the story, without diluting any of the meaning in legal documents.

== Definition ==
Litigation PR is the management of the communication process before and during a legal dispute or adjudicatory processing so as to affect the outcome or its impact on the client's overall reputation.

== Objectives ==
One objective of litigation PR is to influence the outcome of the court case by encouraging early or favorable settlement or by pressuring the prosecution into bringing lesser or no charges.

Another objective is to protect the client's reputation before and during the trial. In this regard, litigation PR is similar to reputation management, managing public perception of an organization or individual, rather than information itself. A key aspect of reputation management is influencing attitude about the individual and corporation, which can encourage positive activation to the benefit of the organization.

Author Kathy Fitzpatrick identified six objectives of litigation public relations:

1. Counteracting negative publicity.
2. Making a client's viewpoint known.
3. Ensuring balanced media coverage.
4. Helping the media and the public understand complex legal issues.
5. Defusing a hostile environment.
6. Helping resolve the conflict

To achieve those objectives, the PR agent has to establish credibility with the media as an information source. The next step is to control the flow of information to the media to ensure the preferred narrative is disseminated. The third step is to develop a message that supports the client's position and spread that message to the media and the public.

== Media coverage ==
Litigation PR on the part of defendants, especially in high-profile cases, aims to counter the inherent bias in the media in favor of plaintiffs and prosecutors. When allegations are made public, the media often casts the lawsuit in terms of victim versus villain. News stories frequently lead with the plaintiff or prosecutors' allegations. If the defendant's responses are included at all, they appear well into the story. Thus, the defendant is forced on the defensive from the outset. In such a situation, "working with the media to create more balanced, accurate, and less sensational coverage of a lawsuit is a necessary element in defending high profile defendants".

== Differences from other PR practices ==
- Litigation PR is highly dependent on the media. Although the practice of PR involves more than just mediated communication, litigation PR remains dependent on the media. It is because of the media's increased attention to lawsuits that demand for litigation PR has grown among high-profile clients.
- Because typical public relations campaign strategies and tactics may not be appropriate and may even be harmful at certain times during a lawsuit, the legal strategy must take precedence.
- Litigation PR is more regulated than regular public relations because of the potential to prejudice the legal process. For example, practitioners must ensure that their work does not breach contempt of court laws.
- Litigation PR is directed with the emphasis of one-way, asymmetrical communication. Because the law is adversarial in nature, creating a win-lose situation, the goal of litigation PR is to reinforce the legal strategy and theory of the case to ensure victory and to reduce damage to the organization's credibility and reputation.
