= Global Communication Certification Council =

- Purpose: Regulation of the SCMP and CMP certifications
- Location: Chicago, United States
- Website: gcccouncil.org

The Global Communication Certification Council (GCCC) is an international non-governmental organization that regulates and issues the Strategic Communication Management Professional (SCMP) and the Communication Management Professional (CMP) professional certifications.

The GCCC was organized in 2014 by the International Association of Business Communicators (IABC). In 2020, it was accredited by the American National Standards Institute to issue certifications for communication professionals under ISO/IEC 17024 — according to the council, it is the only ANSI-accredited body to issue such certifications. The GCCC became an independent, non-profit organization separate from the IABC in 2026.

The GCCC is a member organization of the Global Alliance for Public Relations and Communication Management.

== See also ==
- Canadian Public Relations Society
- Chartered Institute of Public Relations
- Public Relations Society of America
