= Journal of Communication Management =

Academic journal covering public relations

- Discipline: Communication, public relations
- Language: English
- Edited by: Jesper Falkheimer

Publication details
- History: 1996–present
- Publisher: Emerald Group Publishing
- Frequency: Quarterly

Standard abbreviations
- ISO 4: J. Commun. Manag.

Indexing
- ISSN: 1363-254X (print); 1478-0852 (web)
- OCLC no.: 49912006

Links
- Journal homepage; Online access; Online archive

The Journal of Communication Management is a quarterly peer-reviewed academic journal covering public relations and published by Emerald Group Publishing. It was established in 1996. The journal is abstracted and indexed in PsycINFO and Scopus. It is a partner of the European Public Relations Education and Research Association and is the preferred publishing partner of the Chartered Institute of Public Relations. The editor-in-chief since 2016 is Jesper Falkheimer (Lund University), taking over from Anne Gregory (Leeds Metropolitan University).
