= International Association of Business Communicators =

Global network of communications professionals

- Company type: Not-for-profit
- Industry: Communications; Public Relations; Marketing; Internal Communications; Human Resources
- Founded: 1970
- Area served: Worldwide
- Website: www.iabc.com

The International Association of Business Communicators (IABC) is a non-profit. It is a professional association for communications professionals. It was formed in 1970 when the American Association of Industrial Editors re-merged with the International Council of Industrial Editors. It grew from 2,280 members in 1970 to 16,000 members by 2008. IABC provides a variety of events, certifications, mentoring programs and other services for communications professionals.

== History ==
IABC's predecessor was the American Association of Industrial Editors (AAIE), which was founded in 1938. AAIE became a member of the International Council of Industrial Editors (ICIE) in 1941. AAIE withdrew from ICIE in 1946 over policy differences, then formed IABC when it merged with ICIE again in 1970. In IABC's first year of operation, the association had 2,280 members and was focused on internal communications. IABC's research showed its members were moving into positions with broader public relations responsibilities and the association expanded its scope. In 1974 it merged with Corporate Communicators Canada.

IABC had financial troubles in 2000 after losing $1 million in an e-business initiative called TalkingBusinessNow. In 2001 a grass-roots initiative was started within IABC's membership that eventually developed into the Gift of Communication program, whereby members donated their professional services to local charities. Membership at IABC grew 7–9 percent each year in the 2000s due to an increasing number of practitioners in the field of internal communications. IABC hosted its first annual world conference in 2005 and grew to more than 16,000 members by 2008. That same year, IABC accredited Chinese citizens for the first time in the Accredited Business Communicator (ABC) program.

For 40 years, the association offered an accreditation program called Accreditation for Business Communications (ABC). By the time the program ended in 2013, a total of 1,003 people had earned ABC status.

== Organization ==
IABC offers professional, corporate, student and retired memberships. Representatives from different chapters and regions, as well as professional members, vote at the Annual General Meeting to elect members to the international executive board. The board can change dues, establish new chapters, create workgroups and remove members with a two-thirds vote. IABC also has various committees focused on ethics, research, finance, auditing and others. All positions within IABC are filled by volunteers. IABC has more than 100 chapters worldwide in North America, Africa, Asia Pacific, and Europe.

== Services ==
IABC hosts networking events, mentoring programs, and certification programs. It publishes a code of ethics. IABC hosts the Gold Quill Awards. The awards are bestowed for "creatively and effectively communicating" in ways that contribute to a local community. In 2014 the Gold Quill has four divisions and more than 40 categories. IABC also publishes a monthly digital magazine Communication World. Recent issues have shared researched and first-person, expert articles on connecting with Millennials, social intranets and crisis communications.

== Publishing ==
- Brent D. Ruben and Stacy M. Smulowitz (August 15, 2007). Core Communication: A Guide to Organizational Assessment, Planning and Improvement. International Association of Business Communicators. ISBN 978-1888015546.
- IABC (January 1982). Without bias: a guidebook for nondiscriminatory communication. Wiley. ISBN 978-0-471-08561-4.
- Tamara Gillis; IABC (21 March 2011). The IABC Handbook of Organizational Communication: A Guide to Internal Communication, Public Relations, Marketing, and Leadership. John Wiley & Sons. ISBN 978-1-118-01635-0.

== See also ==
- Global Communication Certification Council
