= Public Relations Review =

- Language: English
- Edited by: Maureen Taylor

Publication details
- Publisher: Elsevier
- Frequency: Quarterly
- Impact factor: 2.321 (2019)

Standard abbreviations
- ISO 4: Public Relat. Rev.

Indexing
- ISSN: 0363-8111
- OCLC no.: 890209546

Links
- Journal homepage; Online archive

Public Relations Review is a peer-reviewed academic journal covering public relations that is published quarterly by Elsevier. The editor-in-chief is Maureen Taylor. It was established in 1975. According to Journal Citation Reports, the journal has a 2019 impact factor of 2.321, placing it in the second quartile for Communication studies and in the third quartile for Business.
