= European Public Relations Education and Research Association =

Research organization

The European Public Relations Education and Research Association (EUPRERA) is an organization working to promote and combine research and practice within the field of public relations in Europe.

It organizes and promotes various conferences, including an annual congress and a spring symposium, held in collaboration with selected universities across Europe, as well as the annual International Bled Symposium in Bled, Slovenia.
