= Journal of Public Relations Research =

- Discipline: Public Relations
- Language: English
- Edited by: Sung-Un Yang

Publication details
- History: 1989–present
- Publisher: Taylor and Francis, Association for Education in Journalism and Mass Communication. Public Relations Division.
- Impact factor: 1.720

Standard abbreviations
- ISO 4: J. Public Relat. Res.

Indexing
- ISSN: 1062-726X (print); 1532-754X (web)

Links
- Journal homepage

The Journal of Public Relations Research is a peer-reviewed academic journal on public relations published quarterly by Taylor and Francis for the Public Relations Division of the Association for Education in Journalism and Mass Communication. The editor-in-chief is Sung-Un Yang (Boston University). The journal was established in 1989.
