= Communications management =

System of communication in an organization

Communications management is the systematic planning, implementing, monitoring, and revision of all the channels of communication within an organization and between organizations. It also includes the organization and dissemination of new communication directives connected with an organization, network, or communications technology. Aspects of communications management include developing corporate communication strategies, designing internal and external communications directives, and managing the flow of information, including online communication. It is a process that helps an organization to be systematic as one within the bounds of communication.

Communication and management are closely linked together. Since communication is the process of information exchange of two or people and management includes managers that gives out information to their people. Moreover, communication and management go hand in hand. It is the way to extend control; the fundamental component of project management. Without the advantage of a good communications management system, the cycles associated with the development of a task from start to finish can be genuinely compelled. It also gives the fundamental project integrity needed to give an information help among all individuals from the team. This information must stream descending, upward, and horizontally inside the association. Moreover, it is both master and servant of project control. It is the action component, the integrator of the process toward assembling the project. As project management is both a craftsmanship and a science, the project manager leads the multidiscipline of the plan and construct team.

== The role of communication in management ==
The management's part is to achieve the objectives of the organization itself. To be able to do this, managers should make an action plan that simply defines what, when, and how it would be done & finished. In order to execute the plan, managers must pass on the information to everybody in the organization. Good communication advises as well as assists with making a culture that causes individuals to feel like they have a place with and need to help the organization.

Organizations are totally reliant on communication, which is defined as the exchange of ideas, messages, or information by speech, signals, or writing. Without communication, organizations would not function. If communication is diminished or hampered, the entire organization suffers. When communication is thorough, accurate, and timely, the organization tends to be vibrant and effective.

Communication is central to the entire management process for four primary reasons:

1. Communication is a linking process of management.
2. Communication is the primary means by which people obtain and exchange information.
3. The most time‐consuming activity a manager engages in is communication.
4. Information and communication represent power in organizations.

The ability to communicate well, both orally and in writing, is a critical managerial skill and a foundation of effective leadership. Through communication, people exchange and share information with one another and influence one another's attitudes, behaviors, and understandings.

== Importance of communications management ==
Communications management focuses on the coordination and distribution of information within a project. Communication management plans typically outline communication processes, information flows, and the responsibilities of project participants.

To ensure solid communication management throughout a project, a communication management plan should be created. The benefits of a communication management plan are five-fold:

- A written framework that both client/stakeholders/team members can reference. This can help in case there is any need for mediation—you have a written paper trail you can refer back to. It can also be beneficial for accounts payable to reference in case there are gaps in time tracked for the project.
- The plan itself will manage expectations from stakeholders to not anticipate a finished project before the deliverables have been tested for quality assurance.
- The points at which communication is shared allow both stakeholders to provide valuable feedback to the project process as well as the final product, and give team members a chance to brainstorm ideas together, bridging the divide between the two groups.
- It allows all involved to better discover risks and issues early on.
- It helps to eliminate the need to hold unnecessary meetings on the books, saving both time and money.
- Communication helps manage organizational conflict. Putnam (2013)

Definition of Organizational Conflict – Putnam & Poole (1987) defines conflict as “the interaction of interdependent people who perceive opposition of goals, aims, values, and who see the other party as potentially interfering with the realization of these goals” (p. 552). Communication eases the process of conflict resolution, and helps maintain the balanced relationships, and sets parameters on interactions between affected individuals and groups in the organization.

Putnam (2013) explains that “a few scholars would deny that communication is an essential feature of conflict.” She cited Thomas and Pondy (1977) noted this in their extensive review of conflict in organizations, and that “It is communication with which we are most concerned in understanding conflict management." Communication helps form issues, frame perceptions, translate feelings into conflict, and enact the conflict itself (Putnam & Poole, 1987). Putnam (2013) further stressed that “communication is the means by which conflict gets socially defined” (Simons, 1974b. p. 3)

Putnam, L. (2013). Definitions and approaches to conflict and communication. In J. G. Oetzel & S. Ting -Toomey The SAGE handbook of conflict communication (pp. 1–40). Thousand Oaks, CA: SAGE Publications Inc. doi: 104135/9781452281988.n1

== Communication management and project management ==
In project management, communication management must address the following questions:

- What information needs to flow in and out of the project?
- Who needs what information?
- When is the information needed?
- What is the format of the information?
- Who will be responsible for transmitting and providing the information?

Moreover, this only serves as guidelines and must take into account other factors like cost and access to information.

As defined by the Project Management Institute (1996), project communications management includes processes required to ensure timely and appropriate generation, collection, dissemination, storage, and ultimate disposition of project information. The following communication processes are involved in Project Communications Management, to wit:

- Communication planning – In this phase, the problems, needs and future plans are being identified to ensure attainment of goals and objectives.
- Information distribution – This involves dissemination of information needed by the stakeholders and other members of the organization.
- Performance reporting – This includes status reporting, progress measurement, and forecasting for the future of the organization.
- Administrative closure – This involves generating, gathering, and disseminating information to formalize phase or project completion.

== Management and communication in organizations ==
Management and communication are closely tied together. As defined, communication is the process by which information is shared between two or more people (which includes machines, e.g. computers). Management literature (Lumenways.com) discusses that each management roles – planning, organizing, leading, and controlling – depends on effective communication. Hence, managers must be able to obtain and share accurate and relevant information to be acted upon. When accurate information is sent, received, and shared, employees can be informed, making them more empowered to perform well. However, when information is mangled and misinterpreted, probably, mistaken information will be spread that will cause communication error. Significant problem in the organization would likely occur.

Hence, it is imperative for a manager to effectively understand and apply the basics of the communication process in his/her management and leadership. Further, Lunenburg (2010) recognizes ‘noise’ that distorts a message. He states, ‘different perceptions of the message, language barriers, interruptions, emotions, and attitude are examples of noise’ that hinders one to obtain a clear message to and from the members of the organization. Stereotypes, prejudice (personal bias), feelings (emotions), and language also can serve as ‘noise’ in the communication process. It is also essential that managers must recognize common impediments to effective communication in their respective organizations. In a world filled with multicultural individuals, members of an organization may have different and unfamiliar norms and mores. Managers therefore should be mindful not to discriminate his/her employees based on what is commonly practiced, acknowledge other's feelings (empathy), and communicate simply so everyone gets the message clearly. Effective managers must be adept with the practice of effective communication skills and ICT along with his/her management and leadership practice despite radical changes in the environment. This would lead to a more productive performance of the organization. With these, a manager would eventually stand out in the global world.

Meng and Berger identified that four factors are thought to be the most crucial for measuring the success of internal communication:

1. Helping employees understand new policies and programs

2. Teaching employees about organizational culture and values

3. Informing employees of organizational performance and financial goals

4. Helping employees understand how the business works

Two-way communication matters as it can improve business performance through effective internal communication, leading to understanding their role, coordinating and facilitating organizational different departments within the organization.

Internal communication is the strategic practice and function of sharing information, building understanding, and creating alignment among people within an organization.

Modern management approaches suggest including employees more frequently in an effort to create relationships that will benefit both parties. According to Cropanzano and Mitchell (2005), these interactions can help develop high-quality partnerships between management and employees.

Employee engagement is considered a state where employees are emotionally connected to others and are more aware of their surroundings, including their job at hand. Harter, Schmidt and Hayes refer to employee engagement with clear expectations, contributing to the organization, a sense of belonging, and opportunities for growth.

The building blocks of employee engagement are employee commitment, job satisfaction, and extra-role behavior.

== The communication process ==
Some would say that the communication process may seem simple where an individual sends a message and someone else receives it. The communication process describes how a message is delivered and received. When looking at communication as a process, then, one must also look into its elements. Berlo's model of communication (1961) is one good example to discuss the process since the model elucidates the commonly used elements such as the source, receiver, message, channel, and feedback. As Ongkiko & Flor (2006) pointed out, a basic understanding of the communication process is important to achieve the highest social good in its application.

According to Berlo (1961) (cited in Ongkiko & Flor, 2006), source refers to a person or a group of persons “with a purpose, a reason for engaging in communication”. Here, the source serves as the initiator in the communication process. On the other hand, the receiver is the person or group of persons at the other end of the communication process.

The receiver, according to Berlo (1961), is the target of communication, where he/she listens when the source communicates (verbally or nonverbally). The message is the transmitted idea, purpose, or intention that has been translated into a code or a systematic set of symbols from the source. Berlo (1961) identified three factors of a message which include: message code (e.g. language), message content (e.g. information presented, conclusions, etc.), and message treatment (e.g. angle of the story, news framing, etc.).

Communication channels are mediums through which messages are transmitted. It is also known as the carrier of communication (Lunenburg, 2010). Communication channels could be communication through email, phone calls, face-to-face conversations, written reports, or nonverbal gestures and facial expressions. Messages can be distorted through communication noise. Noise could be a different perception of the message, language barriers, emotions, interruptions, or different attitudes. Feedback is when the receiver responds to the sender's message and returns it to the sender. It allows for the sender to determine whether their message has been received and understood (Lunenburg, 2010).

Effective communication is a two-way process. Two-way communication occurs when feedback and effort are given by both the sender and the receiver. The sender’s job is to ensure their message is clear and provides a good foundation of the content. The receiver’s job is to both receive and send messages (Lunenburg, 2010). The ability to listen enhances communication, which can be done by active listening. Active listening is when a receiver is aware of both the verbal and nonverbal communication from the sender. Being able to identify both forms of communication allows the receiver to understand the entire meaning of the message.

In project management, managers should always consider and understand that in a communication process, there are always elements that are continually changing, dynamic, and interacting (Ongkiko and Flor, 2006). Further, the events and relationships among the elements are seen as being: on-going, cyclic, ever-changing, no beginning and no end, interdependent, and interrelated.

In an organization, an effective manager should communicate well and competently with his or her subordinates. It is essential for managers and leaders to ably express their opinions and issue instructions clearly with their members to understand what exactly is expected from them. Effective communication in an organization can be a basis for sound decision-making and planning, facilitates smooth and efficient work and coordination in the organization, increases managerial capacity, can be a useful tool for public relations (image building), increases productivity, and others.

It may seem simple, but the communication process is more than just a process wherein a person sends a message and others receive it. In the communication process, the message must be sent and received correctly and accurately. From the sender who encodes the message, he/she will send the message through a channel. The Receiver now decodes the message and after which, he/she will give a feedback back to the sender of the message. The feedback indicates how the message has been interpreted by the receiver. It may or it may not be the same with how the sender encodes the message.

=== Four-step process for effective communication ===
The project manager and the project team work together to identify who needs what information. In other words, project management needs to know what the requirements of successful communications are in order to plan on how to achieve those requirements.

Identify communication requirements
"A project of this size, with this vast amount of stakeholders, requires this much communication," said project sponsor Kisper, as she stretched her arms wider and wider apart. "Communication is, without a doubt, a project manager's most important job."

Identify the 5Ws (Why, What, When, Where, Who) and 1H (How)

- Who needs to be communicated to. This is based on the communication formula and needs to be determined.
- What needs to be communicated. All information related to the project need not be communicated to everyone in the team.
- When it should be communicated. The timeline of communication should be monitored.
- Where should it be communicated. If the team involves many people, then individual level and team level communications needs to be resolved.
- Why communication of information is essential and to what level is important. Why is it not encouraged as it is blame rather than change.
- How the communication needs to be done. Is it conducted via e-mail, phone, or a presentation done to the team members?

Identify and accommodate the enterprise environmental factors
Much of the communications management processes are linked to the enterprise environmental factors.

Identify organizational process assets
The organizational process assets affect how the project manager, project team, and the stakeholders will communicate within a project.

== The role of communication in management ==
Communication and management come hand in hand. Communication as defined by Merriam Webster Dictionary, is a process by which information is exchanged between individuals through a common system of symbols, signs of behavior. On the other hand, management is the act of getting people together to accomplish desired goals and objectives using available resources efficiently and effectively by means of its four functions: planning, organizing, directing, and controlling. These four functions depend on effective communication.

Communication is considered to be the means through which members of organization relate with one another by interchanging ideals, facts and feeling, through the use of words, letters, memoranda, symbols and bulletins (Nnamseh, 2009). And one way for the organization to attain certain organizational objectives, is through efficient transmission of information, ideals, attitudes, and feelings within its members, through the process of communication (Etuk, 1991).

Management aims to accomplish the goals and objectives of an organization. They must plan for the future of their organization and these plans must be communicated well to the members of the organization in order for these to succeed. Without proper communication, the plans of the management would be hard to achieve. An effective communication can help in the following areas of management, including:

- Provides clarity – Without effective communication, information would not be disseminated properly. It gives clear instructions and information to everyone to avoid confusion, conflicts and misunderstanding.
- Builds relationship – If the management can communicate well with their people, it can result to a reduced-tension between them. Good communication can help builds relationship and gain trust.
- Creates commitment – Communication is a two-way process, we send and we receive message. If there is an effective communication strategy, the management can also listen well to their people, thus encouraging people's opinion and points of view. People who feel belong and engaged are most likely to give a good feedback which is very essential in communication.
- Defines expectations – When there are standards that are set, people will be aware of what they need to do to get a positive feedback and the benefits that come with it.

The management can reach their goals and objectives through the help of an effective communication.

The role of communication is not only crucial between management and employees within the organization but also in the interaction and relationship between the management and the organization's external stakeholders. External stakeholders are those who do not directly work with a company but are affected somehow by the actions and outcomes of the business. Suppliers, creditors, and public groups are all considered external stakeholders. It is through communication in the form of meetings, newsletter, summary report and conference calls with external stakeholders that specialists acting in behalf of management, are able to procure resources, support and feedback on organizational products and services which are important to measure overall organization performance. The role of communication with external stakeholders is also important in management strategic planning. In the early stages of strategic planning process, external stakeholder opinions and insights are especially valuable as they add to understanding the operating environment, as well as to the vision of the organization's future. It is through using all communication means available such as newsletters, electronic messaging, emails, meeting, posters, etc. that management is able to let external stakeholders engage and understand the organization's core purpose, why the organization exists and what value it provides for its customers, vendors, and the market.

== Method of communication ==
Communication process alone would not be the only basis for communications management's success. Managers should take note about the methods of Communication. The standard method that is usually used is oral and written ones. Aside from this, there is also the non – verbal communication.

Management uses various effective methods of communication with internal and external audiences. The most common traditional methods and styles are oral, written, face-to-face, nonverbal, physical nonverbal, paralanguage and visual. A better understanding of these methods and styles will help management in knowing as well as dealing with staff in a better way, clear any misconceptions or misunderstandings that may exist and thus contribute to the organization's success.

Oral communication includes the spoken word which are done formally over the phone, face to-face, lectures, video conferencing, voice chat, meetings and conferences, and informally over grapevine and rumor mill. It also includes the speed, volume, pitch, voice modulation, clarity of speech and also the non-verbal communications like visual cues and body language. Written communication on the other hand refers to the writing and typing paper and pen documents and letters, text chats, emails, typed electronic documents, reports, SMS and anything else that might be conveyed by the use of written symbols in any documents that are part of the day-to-day business life. Such method of communication is indispensable for any formal business communication and for the issue of legal instructions.

Face-to-face style of communication is the preferred method of communication especially in meetings and participation in discussion. While the nonverbal communication or the sending and receiving of wordless messages convey authentic feelings and thoughts, it is not effective in a workplace communication without the supplement of verbal or written communication. The body language style or physical nonverbal communication consists of body posture, facial expressions, eye contact, gestures like a pointed finger, wave and the like touch tone of voice, overall movements of the body and others. From body language such as facial expressions and facial muscles, silent messages and authentic human emotions can be sent and conveyed without uttering a word. Thus, a change in the emotional state becomes visible when there is a change in facial expression.

The paralanguage style of communication refers to the way something is said, instead of what is actually said. This is manifested in the style of speaking, tone, emotion, stress, pitch, intonation and voice quality. The visual communication type takes place through the help of visual aids, color, illustration, graphic design, drawing, typography, signs charts, graphs and other electronic resources.

Technology, worldwide lockdowns and the social distancing protocol caused by the COVID-19 pandemic have caused new and popular methods such as video conferencing and social media chat meetings to emerge popular. They brought the Zoom Video Communications platform, as people replaced in-person work and social events with videoconferencing, widely utilized.

== Oral communication ==
A huge extent of oral communication is straightforwardly associated with Communications Management. For instance, if a manager doesn't speak or make it clear to a sales group, this may prompt contrasts in objectives and accomplishments.

There are two parts of oral communication:

- Active listening - It is where the person, who receives the message pays attention to the information, interprets and remembers.
- Constructive feedback - It is where managers fail most of the time. Feedback needs to be constructive and then it will help the employees to shape up their performance instead of mere criticism.

A major skill which should be developed to master oral communication is active listening. It constitutes a complex parameter of communication rather than a natural effortless hearing process. Effective listening encompasses both the literal and the critical understanding of information and ideas, which are conveyed through oral communication. Through listening, people are exposed to a broad spectrum of experiences, which help them develop their linguistic potential. Active listening skills promote information collection, evaluation of situations, empathy, acceptance of persons and ideas (Mousena and Sidiropoulou, 2018).

== Weekly reporting method ==
One simple and popular communications method is called the weekly reporting method: every employee composes an e-mail report, once a week, including information on their activities in the preceding week, their plans for the following week, and any other information deemed relevant to the larger group, bearing in mind length considerations. Reports are sent to managers, who summarize and report to their own managers, eventually leading to an overall summary led by the CEO, which is then sent to the board of directors. The CEO then sends the board's summary back down the ladder, where each manager can append an additional summary or note before referring it to their employees.

Eventually, each employee will receive a long e-mail, containing many or all of the above-mentioned summaries, from every level of management; reading the full result is rarely a requirement. Curious or ambitious employees are considered more likely to read the result; task-centered employees, however, are not.

== Management in communication media system ==
Social media systems are considered to be a fast-moving element in the development of digital media as the modern-day tool in communicating knowledge and information. The ability to create a message and the digital means to translate it has an enormous influence in considering social media as a prevailing medium. The dominant function of social media to code or translate content into comprehensible expression with the support of technical medium has yielded a unique facet in this contemporary mode of communication. However, this cutting-edge approach of conveying content may be more credible if efficient types of communication management are employed as another method of disseminating news and information. There is some debate about what type or style of management will suit the structure and context of the present-day interaction and exchange of ideas in social media system.

The ‘organizational dynamics’ of management is considerably relevant to this present-day communication system that has been occupied by digital sophistications and uncertainties due to the ever-growing properties and features of social media. Organizational dynamics refers to the course of action in developing the resources continuously, and in augmenting the maximum capacity of the individuals within the system through organizational learning, exercises and decisive leadership (“What is Organizational Dynamics?,” n.d.). This communication management regulates the initial worth in realizing the communication goals that may lead to the potential results that would produce a lasting impact change within the organization or institution. Social media system has its luminous quality, with no exact structure and trend. As time changes, social media communication will still be around for expansion, but its management will be regarded as a functional reinforcing structure for its goal, task, and purpose.

Most significantly, this type of management necessitates high degree or quantity of creativity as the primary requirement in the production of contents. According to Küng (2007), high volumes of creativity involve countless elevations of deep-rooted motivation which are strongly swayed by five precise attributes of work environment as follows: a) reinforcement in creating innovative ideas; b) self-sufficiency in attaining the targets; c) properties in setting task motivation and mastery; d) challenge in modeling imaginative and inspired thinking skills; and e) team structure with variety of viewpoints and familiarities.

The article of Jo Silvester, Leading in the Digital Era (2019), deliberates and proposes the type of leader or manager a digital society must have, more explicitly with the growth of the internet and social media devices for the efficient distribution of tasks and accountabilities. The article urges contemporary leaders or managers to be both politically aware and digitally/technically skilled. The author deems that there are enormous modifications in the way leaders or managers perform their roles and duties, from the customary way of seeing the working situation, setting up an organizational goal, and executing the program of action, leaders or managers now participate in freely accessible electronic or digital conferences and discourses with investors and turn out to be familiarized with the rapid change of ethical, social, and situational patterns.

Moreover, the article gives emphasis on the practicality of social media as a system in framing the qualities of a leader or a manager in terms of the way he generates impressions from individuals and other major elements of the organizational system. The author recognizes the five most important contexts in shaping the role, extent, and tasks of a leader or a manager, which are all associated with the purpose, relevance, and service of social media in delivering quality leadership. First, the context of a wide-ranging impact in which social media can touch diverse people where the control of a leader or a manager can even move beyond his workers, clients and providers. The second idea is immense clarity or directness that utilizes an established recording of previous plans and actions that can transform leader or manager into more observable or evident one. Third is the notion of a better democratization which is considered function of a greater transparency in which a leader or a manager who obtains more followers on social media can be more influential and powerful. Fourth, high-speed communication process where the utilization of digital method like using hashtags can get hold of more people in real time. Finally, the opportunity of gaining control of media since the merging of one's capacity to create a message and the digital means to translate it has an enormous influence in considering social media as a prevailing and an easily reached facility.

The digital world connects to internal communication in ways that go beyond simply using technology to share information within an organization. Digital communication became more widespread during the COVID-19 pandemic as many employees worked remotely from home. Digital technology has introduced tools such as social media and artificial intelligence (AI) which organizations have also had to adapt to. Digital internal communication serves as a strategic management function rather than simply serving as a communication tool. It has been difficult to differentiate between cultural and mass communication as the boundaries between internal and external communication have become less distinct. Wuersch, Neher, and Peter (2023) examine digital internal communication at three levels: organizational, interpersonal, and intrapersonal. Their research demonstrates how digital internal communication connects both technological and social elements, including how employees communicate, collaborate and develop relationships within an organization. The researchers’ analysis also revealed that social elements of digital internal communication regarding the intrapersonal side as one of the top six themes:

1. Digital skills

2. Joining mindset and attitude

3. Employee engagement

4. Voice and participation

5. Job satisfaction

6. Employee experience and well-being.

Digital transformation also influences the skills, adaptability, learning agility, and behaviors of both leaders and staff.
