= Public relations =

Management of public communication of organizations

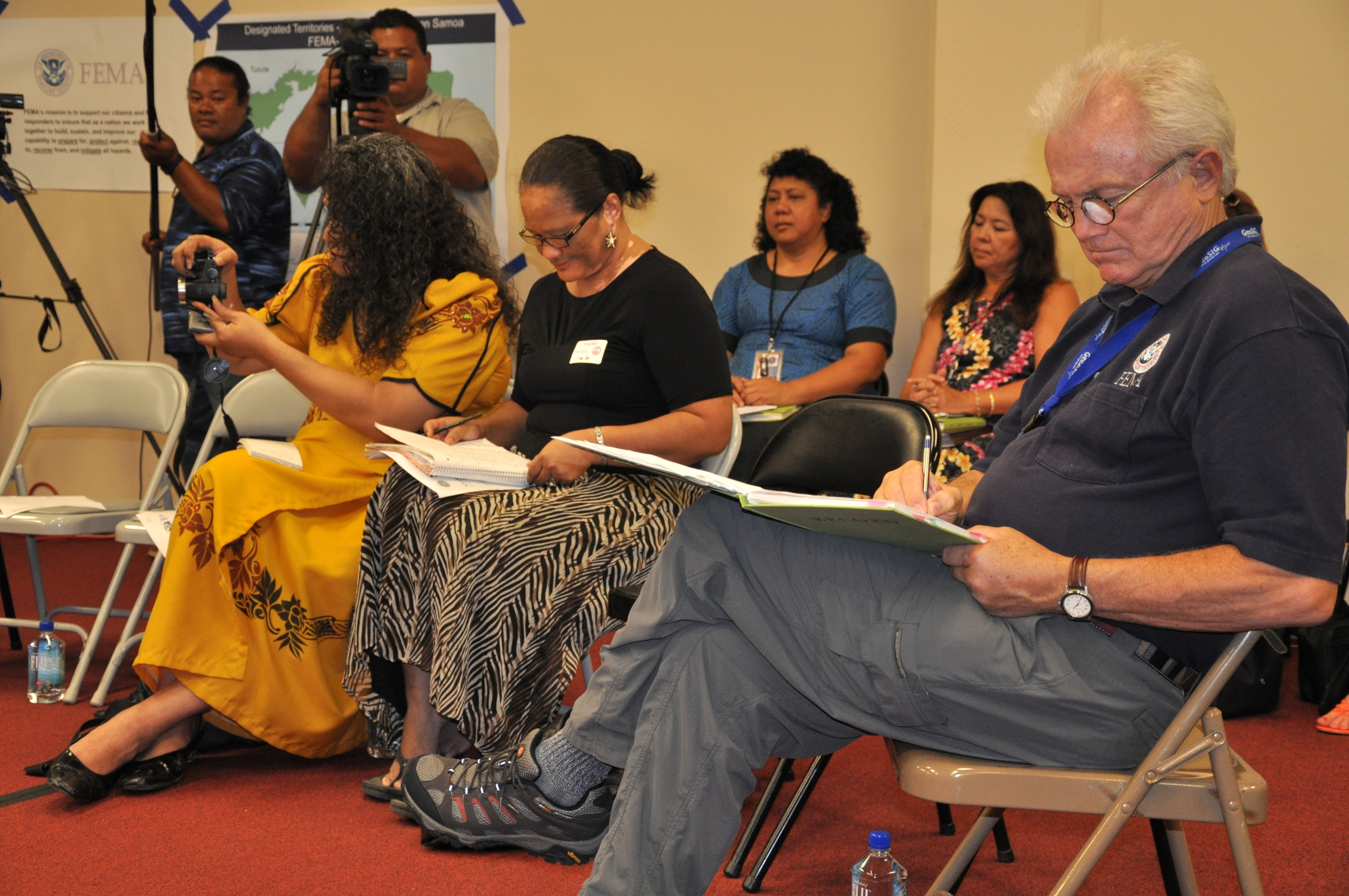
Media conferences are one approach used in public relations.

Public relations (PR) is the practice of managing and disseminating information from an individual or an organization (such as a business, government agency, or a nonprofit organization) to the public in order to influence their perception. Public relations and publicity differ in that PR is controlled internally, whereas publicity is not controlled but contributed by external parties. Public relations may include an organization or individual gaining exposure to their audiences using topics of public interest and news items that do not require direct payment. PR and journalism share a close relationship known as media relations, but they also differ in their core objectives: while journalism reports on events with objectivity and impartiality, PR presents developments in a way that supports the interests of the organization it represents. The exposure is mostly media-based, and this differentiates it from advertising as a form of marketing communications. Public relations often aims to create or obtain coverage for clients for free, also known as earned media, rather than paying for marketing or advertising also known as paid media. However, advertising, especially of the type that focuses on distributing information or core PR messages, is also a part of broader PR activities.

An example of public relations would be generating an article featuring a PR firm's client, rather than paying for the client to be advertised next to the article. The aim of public relations is to inform the public, prospective customers, investors, partners, employees, and other stakeholders, and persuade them to maintain a favorable view about the organization, its leadership, products, or political decisions. Public relations professionals typically work for PR and marketing firms, businesses and companies, government, and public officials as public information officers and nongovernmental organizations, and nonprofit organizations. Jobs central to public relations include internal positions such as public relations coordinator, public relations specialist, and public relations manager, and outside agency positions such as account coordinator, account executive, account supervisor, and media relations manager. In the UK, the equivalent job titles are account executive, account manager, account director and director.

Public relations specialists establish and maintain relationships with an organization's target audiences, the media, relevant trade media, and other opinion leaders. Common responsibilities include designing communications campaigns, writing press releases and other content for news, working with the press, arranging interviews for company spokespeople, writing speeches for company leaders, acting as an organization's spokesperson, preparing clients for press conferences, media interviews and speeches, writing website and social media content, managing company reputation, crisis management, managing internal communications, and marketing activities like brand awareness and event management. Success in the field of public relations requires a deep understanding of the interests and concerns of each of the company's many stakeholders. The public relations professional must know how to effectively address those concerns using the most powerful tool of the public relations trade, which is publicity.

== Definitions ==
Ivy Lee, the man who turned around the Rockefeller name and image, and his friend, Edward Louis Bernays, established the first definition of public relations in the early 20th century as: "a management function, which tabulates public attitudes, defines the policies, procedures and interests of an organization... followed by executing a program of action to earn public understanding and acceptance." However, when Lee was later asked about his role in a hearing with the United Transit Commission, he said "I have never been able to find a satisfactory phrase to describe what I do." In 1948, historian Eric Goldman noted that the definition of public relations in Webster's Dictionary would be "disputed by both practitioners and critics in the field."

According to Bernays, the public relations counsel is the agent working with both modern media of communications and group formations of society in order to provide ideas to the public's consciousness. Furthermore, he is also concerned with ideologies and courses of actions as well as material goods and services and public utilities and industrial associations and large trade groups for which it secures popular support.

In August 1978, the World Assembly of Public Relations Associations defined the field as

"the art and social science of analyzing trends, predicting their consequences, counselling organizational leaders and implementing planned programs of action, which will serve both the organization and the public interest."

The Public Relations Society of America, a professional trade association, defined public relations in 1982 as:

"Public relations helps an organization and its publics adapt mutually to each other."

In 2011 and 2012, the PRSA solicited crowd-supplied definitions for the term and allowed the public to vote on one of three finalists. The winning definition stated that:

"Public relations is a strategic communication process that builds mutually beneficial relationships between organizations and their publics."

The UK-based Chartered Institute of Public Relations focuses its definition on reputation:

"Public Relations is about reputation – the result of what you do, what you say and what others say about you. Public Relations is the discipline which looks after reputation, with the aim of earning understanding and support and influencing opinion and behaviour. It is the planned and sustained effort to establish and maintain goodwill and mutual understanding between an organisation and its publics."

In February 2026, the UK-based Public Relations and Communications Association published a core and extended definition of public relations. The core definition says:

"Public relations is the strategic management discipline that builds trust, enhances reputation and helps leaders interpret complexity and manage volatility - delivering measurable outcomes including stakeholder confidence, long-term value creation and commercial growth."

Public relations can also be defined as the practice of managing communication between an organization and its publics.

=== 'Publics' ===
Quentin Langley argues the use of the word "publics" in the plural is "central to the understanding" of public relations, writing "all organisations have a series of publics, or stakeholders, on whom their success depends". He follows Roger Hayward (1991) in dividing the publics into "customers (past, present, and future), staff (past, present, and future), investors (past, present, and future), politicians and regulators, neighbours, and business partners (suppliers, distributors, etc.)". Langley also contests the marketing perspective of seeing public relations as part of marketing, which he claims is too focused on just one of Hayward's six publics: customers.

== History ==
Public relations has historical roots pre-dating the 20th century. Most textbooks regard the establishment of the "Publicity Bureau" in Boston in 1900 as marking the founding of a public relations profession. Academics have found early forms of public influence and communications management in ancient civilizations. Aristotle's Rhetoric, for example, explains core foundations for persuasion. Evidence shows that it continued to evolve during the settling of the New World and during the movement to abolish slavery in England. Basil Clarke is considered the founder of public relations in the United Kingdom for his establishment of "Editorial Services" in 1924.

The United States, the United Kingdom, Germany, and others used the concept of propaganda, which later evolved into public relations, to rally domestic support and to demonize enemies during the World Wars (compare journalism). World War I (1914–1918), which affected not only military but whole populations, is considered to be "modern propaganda's launching pad". This led to more sophisticated commercial publicity efforts as public-relations talent entered the private sector. Most historians believe modern-day public relations was first established in the US by Ivy Lee (1877–1934) in 1903 when he started working as the image maker for and corporate advisor for Rockefeller. Edward Bernays (1891–1995), who handled the publicity of theatrical associations in 1913, then spread internationally. Meanwhile, in the nascent Soviet Russia of the 1920s, artists and poets (such as Mayakovsky) engaged in public-relations campaigns for various state agencies and causes (note for example Likbez).

Many American companies with PR departments spread the practice to Europe when they set up European subsidiaries in the wake of the Marshall plan of 1948–1952.

In the second half of the 20th century, public relations entered an era of professional development. Trade associations, PR news-magazines, international PR agencies, and academic principles for the profession were established. In the early 2000s, press-release services began offering social-media press releases. The Cluetrain Manifesto predicted the effect of social media in 1999. As of 2024, social media has been widely used by businesses for advertising and direct engagement with customers, and is considered a necessary tool for influence.

As of 2026, public relations is also used to generate mentions in AI tools via generative engine optimization (GEO) services, as a means of "lead generation and brand positioning".

== By country and region ==
=== South Asia ===
Public relations activity in South Asia expanded through the 2010s and 2020s, with rising spend on digital and influencer-led campaigns in major markets such as India alongside traditional media relations.

=== East Asia ===
In parts of East Asia, including Japan and South Korea, PR is often closely integrated with corporate communications and crisis management within large organizations, reflecting long-standing managerial and cultural norms.

=== Latin America ===
Industry surveys report high optimism and growth expectations among PR leaders across Latin America, with agencies serving both local brands and multinational networks.

=== Middle East and North Africa ===
Sector snapshots from industry bodies indicate a fast-evolving PR market across MENA, with professional activity and events commonly conducted in both Arabic and English, and growing attention to measurement, ethics and workforce trends.

=== Sub-Saharan Africa ===
Research and industry reporting highlight sustained growth and professionalization across key hubs such as Nigeria, Kenya and South Africa, supported by regional associations and an expanding agency landscape.

=== Continental Europe (non-Anglophone) ===
Long-running surveys of European practitioners describe a strong orientation to strategic communication, stakeholder dialogue and evaluation across many non-Anglophone markets.

== Tactics ==
Public relations professionals present the face of an organization or individual, usually to articulate its objectives and official views on issues of relevance, primarily to the media. Public relations contributes to the way an organization is perceived by influencing the media and maintaining relationships with stakeholders. According to Jacquie L'Etang from Queen Margaret University, public relations professionals can be viewed as "discourse workers specializing in communication and the presentation of argument and employing rhetorical strategies to achieve managerial aims."

Specific public relations disciplines include:

- Business-to-business (B2B) PR – Using business and trade media strategies to help businesses market to industry and customer organizations
- Financial public relations – Communicating financial results and business strategy to existing and potential shareholders, stakeholders and influencers, including the media and financial analysts
- Consumer/lifestyle public relations – Generating publicity and positive attention for a particular product or service through consumer and local media and special events
- Crisis communication – Organizational planning and communications response to various types of crises including natural disasters, serious accidents, dramatic financial changes, plant closures, labor disputes such as strikes and government actions such as product recalls
- Internal communications – Creating a company culture through words, actions and company policies that helps employees respond more effectively to achieve the organization's mission
- Government relations – Engaging government departments to influence public policy
- Media relations – Building and maintaining close relationships with the news media so that they can fairly and accurately report on a business or organization
- Social media/community marketing – Leveraging social media marketing and special events to convey messages about clients to desired target markets
- 'Black Hat PR' – Manipulating public profiles under the guise of neutral commentators or voices or engaging to actively damage or undermine the reputations of the rival or targeted individuals or organizations
- Executive visibility – a strategy used to grow an executive's presence and exposure in order to impact a company's success

Building and managing relationships with those who influence an organization or individual's audiences have a central role in public relations. After a public relations practitioner has been working in the field, they develop relationships with the media and other influencers that become an asset, especially for those in media relations. Media directories are also available that offer extensive lists of broadcast, print and online media that list the names of editors, deadlines and the type of contributions they may accept. Perhaps foremost among these is Cision Media Contacts Database, formerly known as Bacon's Media Directories. Media can be searched and organized in a variety of ways including by type (e.g. magazines, newspapers, radio, TV, websites/blogs), industry, and publication frequency (e.g. daily, weekly, monthly, online).

Within each PR discipline, typical activities include publicity events, speaking opportunities, press releases, newsletters, blogs, social media, press kits, and outbound communication with members of the press. Video and audio news releases (VNRs and ANRs) are often produced and distributed to TV outlets for potential use in regular program content.

=== Audience targeting ===
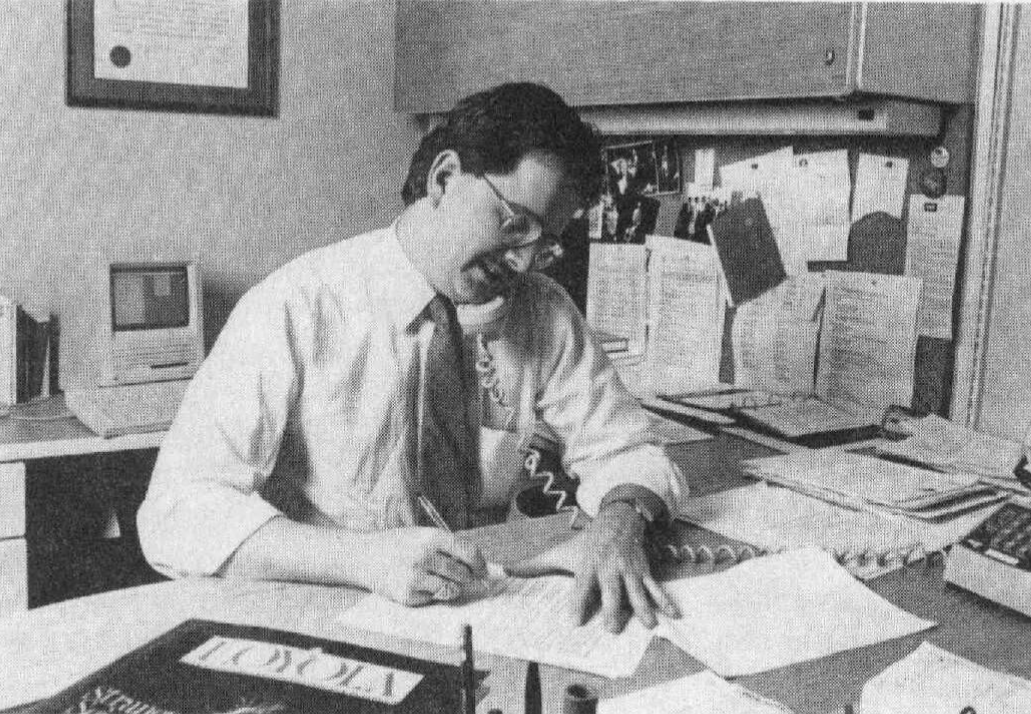
Public relations specialists attempt to create a favourable public image for their clients.

A fundamental PR technique is to identify target audience(s) and tailor messages relevant to each audience. Audience targeting requires public relations professionals to have a deep understanding of the needs and desires of each audience segment they want to reach. Sometimes the interests of differing audiences and stakeholders common to a public relations effort necessitate the creation of several distinct but complementary messages. These messages however should be relevant to each other, thus creating consistency in the overall message and theme. Audience targeting tactics are important for public relations practitioners because they face all kinds of problems: low visibility, lack of public understanding, opposition from critics, and insufficient support from funding sources.

On the other hand, stakeholder theory identifies people who have a stake in a given institution or issue. All audiences are stakeholders (or presumptive stakeholders), but not all stakeholders are members of a target audience. For example, if a charity commissions a public relations agency to create an advertising campaign to raise money to find a cure for a disease, the charity and the people with the disease are stakeholders, but the audience is anyone who is likely to donate money. Public relations experts possess deep skills in media relations, market positioning, and branding. They are powerful agents that help clients deliver clear, unambiguous information to a target audience that matters to them.

=== The public in public relations ===
A public is any group whose members share a common interest or common values regarding a particular subject, such as a political party. These members are considered stakeholders, who are people with a stake or an interest in an organization or issue that potentially involves the organization or group in which they are interested. The publics in public relations are:

- Traditional Publics: Groups with which the individual has an ongoing and long-term relationship. These may include Employees, Media, Governments, Investors, and Customers
- Non-Traditional Publics: Groups that are typically unfamiliar with the organization and the individual has not had a relationship with but may become traditional publics due to changes in the organization, in society or if a group changing event occurs.
- Latent Publics: A group whose values have come into contact with the values of the organization but whose members have not yet realized it; the members of that public are not yet aware of the relationship.
- Aware Publics: A group of members who are aware of the existence of a commonality of values or interests with the organization but have not organized or attempted to respond to that commonality.
- Intervening Publics: Any public that helps an individual send a message to another public, could be the media or someone with stature.
- Primary Publics: If a public can directly affect an organization's pursuit of its values-driven goals. This publics would include media, employees, government, shareholder, financial institutions, and the immediate community.
- Secondary Publics: Have high interest in the company such as the primary publics but will not be directly affected by decisions of the organization.
- Internal Publics: People within an organization
- External Publics: People outside of an organization
- Domestic Publics: Those within the country
- International Publics: Those outsides of the country and when communicating with these publics individuals must be wary of that areas culture, beliefs, values, ethic, and other valuable cultural difference as to not offend anyone.

Early literature authored by James Grunig (1978) suggested that publics develop in stages determined by their levels of problem recognition, constraint recognition and involvement in addressing the issue. The theory posited that publics develop in the following stages:

- Non-Publics: Share no issue with an organization.
- Latent Publics: Face an issue but do not recognize it.
- Apathetic Publics: Face an issue but do not care to address it.
- Aware Publics: Face an issue but are unorganized to mobilize against it.
- Active Publics: Face an issue and are organized to respond to it.

=== Messaging ===
Messaging is the process of creating a consistent story around: a product, person, company, or service. Messaging aims to prevent readers from receiving contradictory or confusing information that could instill doubt in their purchasing choices, or other decisions that affect the company. Brands aim to have the same problem statement, industry viewpoint, or brand perception shared across sources and media.

=== Social media marketing ===
Digital marketing is the use of Internet tools and technologies such as search engines, Web 2.0 social bookmarking, new media relations, blogging, and social media marketing. Interactive PR allows companies and organizations to disseminate information without relying solely on mainstream publications and to communicate directly with the public, customers and prospects.

PR practitioners have always relied on the media such as TV, radio, and magazines, to promote their ideas and messages tailored specifically to a target audience. Social media marketing is not only a new way to achieve that goal, but also a continuation of a strategy that existed for decades. Lister et al. said that "Digital media can be seen as a continuation and extension of a principal or technique that was already in place".

Social media platforms enable users to connect with audiences to build brands, increase sales, and drive website traffic. This involves publishing content on social media profiles, engaging with followers, analyzing results, and running social media advertisements. The goal is to produce content that users will share with their social network to help a company increase brand exposure and broaden customer reach. Some of the major social media platforms currently include Facebook, Instagram, Twitter, LinkedIn, Pinterest, YouTube, and Snapchat.

As digital technology has evolved, the methods for measuring the effectiveness of online public relations have improved. The Public Relations Society of America, which has been developing PR strategies since 1947, has identified five steps for measuring online public relations effectiveness.

1. Engagement: Measure the number of people who engaged with an item (social shares, likes and comments).
2. Impressions: Measure the number of people who may have viewed an item.
3. Items: Measure any content (blog posts, articles, etc.) that originally appeared as digital media.
4. Mentions: Measure how many online items mention the brand, organization, or product.
5. Reach: Measure how far the PR campaign managed to penetrate overall and in terms of a particular audience.

=== Types of public relations arenas ===
Publicists can work in a host of different types of business verticals such as entertainment, technology, music, travel, television, food, consumer electronics and more. Many publicists build their career in a specific business space to leverage relationships and contacts. There are different kinds of press strategies for such as B2B (business to business) or B2C (business to consumer). Business to business publicity highlights service providers who provide services and products to other businesses. Business to Consumer publicizes products and services for regular consumers, such as toys, travel, food, entertainment, personal electronics and music.

=== Other techniques ===
Litigation public relations is the management of the communication process during the course of any legal dispute or adjudicatory processing so as to affect the outcome or its effect on the client's overall reputation.

== Crisis management in public relations ==
Organizations use public relations tactics to aid in crisis management to navigate and recover from unexpected events that could threaten their reputation. A crisis can range from natural disasters and product recalls to scandals and cybersecurity breaches.

=== Role of public relations in crisis management ===
Preparation for crisis management includes risk management: the identification and mitigation of potential risks before they occur. Crisis communication is the subset of PR focused on protecting and defending an individual, company, or organization facing a public challenge to its reputation. PR professionals develop crisis communication plans that outline strategies for potential scenarios. This includes identifying spokespersons, establishing communication protocols, and training staff.

During a crisis, timely and transparent communication is vital. PR teams disseminate accurate information to the public, stakeholders, and the media, addressing concerns and correcting misinformation. This is part of media relations: managing interactions with the media to ensure accurate reporting. This also involves stakeholder engagement: keeping employees, investors, and other stakeholders informed.

Post-crisis, PR efforts focus on rebuilding the organization's image and learning from the event to improve future responses. This is part of reputation management, the practice of attempting to shape public perception of an organization by influencing online information.

== Ethics ==
Public relations professionals both serve the public's interest and private interests of businesses, associations, non-profit organizations, and governments. This dual obligation gave rise to heated debates among scholars of the discipline and practitioners over its fundamental values. This conflict represents the main ethical predicament of public relations. In 2000, the Public Relations Society of America (PRSA) responded to the controversy by acknowledging in its new code of ethics "advocacy" – for the first time – as a core value of the discipline.

The field of public relations is generally highly un-regulated, but many professionals voluntarily adhere to the code of conduct of one or more professional bodies to avoid exposure for ethical violations. The Chartered Institute of Public Relations and the Public Relations Society of America are twoorganizations that publish an ethical code. Still, Edelman's 2003 semi-annual trust survey found that only 20 percent of survey respondents from the public believed paid communicators within a company were credible. Individuals in public relations are growing increasingly concerned with their company's marketing practices, questioning whether they agree with the company's social responsibility. They seek more influence over marketing and more of a counseling and policy-making role. On the other hand, individuals in marketing are increasingly interested in incorporating publicity as a tool within the realm marketing.

According to Scott Cutlip, the social justification for public relations is the right for an organization to have a fair hearing of their point of view in the public forum, but to obtain such a hearing for their ideas requires a skilled advocate.

Marketing and communications strategist, Ira Gostin, believes there is a code of conduct when conducting business and using public relations. Public relations specialists have the ability to influence society. Fact-checking and presenting accurate information is necessary to maintain credibility with employers and clients.

=== Public Relation Code of Ethics ===
The Public Relations Society of America established a set of fundamental guidelines it argues people within public relations should practice and use in their business atmosphere. These values are:

- Advocacy: Serving the public interest by acting as responsible advocates for the clientele. This can occur by displaying the marketplace of ideas, facts and viewpoints to aid informed public debate.
- Honesty: Standing by the truth and accuracy of all facts in the case and advancing those statements to the public.
- Expertise: To become and stay informed of the specialized knowledge needed in the field of Public Relations. Taking that knowledge and improving the field through development, research and education. Meanwhile, professionals also build their understanding, credibility, and relationships to understand various audiences and industries.
- Independence: Provide unbiased work to those that are represented while being accountable for all actions.
- Loyalty: Stay devoted to the client while remembering that there is a duty to still serve the public interest.
- Fairness: Honorably conduct business with any and all clients, employers, competitors, peers, vendors, media and general public. Respecting all opinions and right of free expression.

PRSA members must annually agree to follow the code.

=== International Public Relations Code of Ethics ===
There are ethical codes for international forms of public relations, and there are more specific forms from different countries. For example, some countries have certain associations to create ethics and standards to communication across their country.

The International Association of Business Communicators (IABC, founded in 1971), has its own ethical code to enforce a set of guidelines that ensure communication internationality is legal, ethical, and is in good taste. Some principles that members of the board of IABC follow include:

- Having proper and legal communication
- Being understanding and open to other people's cultures, values, and beliefs
- Create communication that is accurate, trusting, to ensure mutual respect and understanding

IABC members must agree to fulfill the following list of ethics to work to improve values of communication throughout the world:

1. Being credible and honest
2. Keeping up with information to ensure accuracy of communication
3. Understanding free speech and respecting this right
4. Having sensitivity towards other people's thoughts, beliefs, and way of life
5. Not taking part in unethical behaviors
6. Obeying policies and laws
7. Giving proper credit to resources used for communication
8. Ensuring private information is protected (not used for personal gain) and if publicized, guarantee proper legal measures will be put in place.
9. Publishers of said communication do not accept gifts, benefits, payments etc.; for work, or their services
10. Creating results and spreading results that are attainable and they can deliver.
11. Being fully truthful to other people, and themselves.

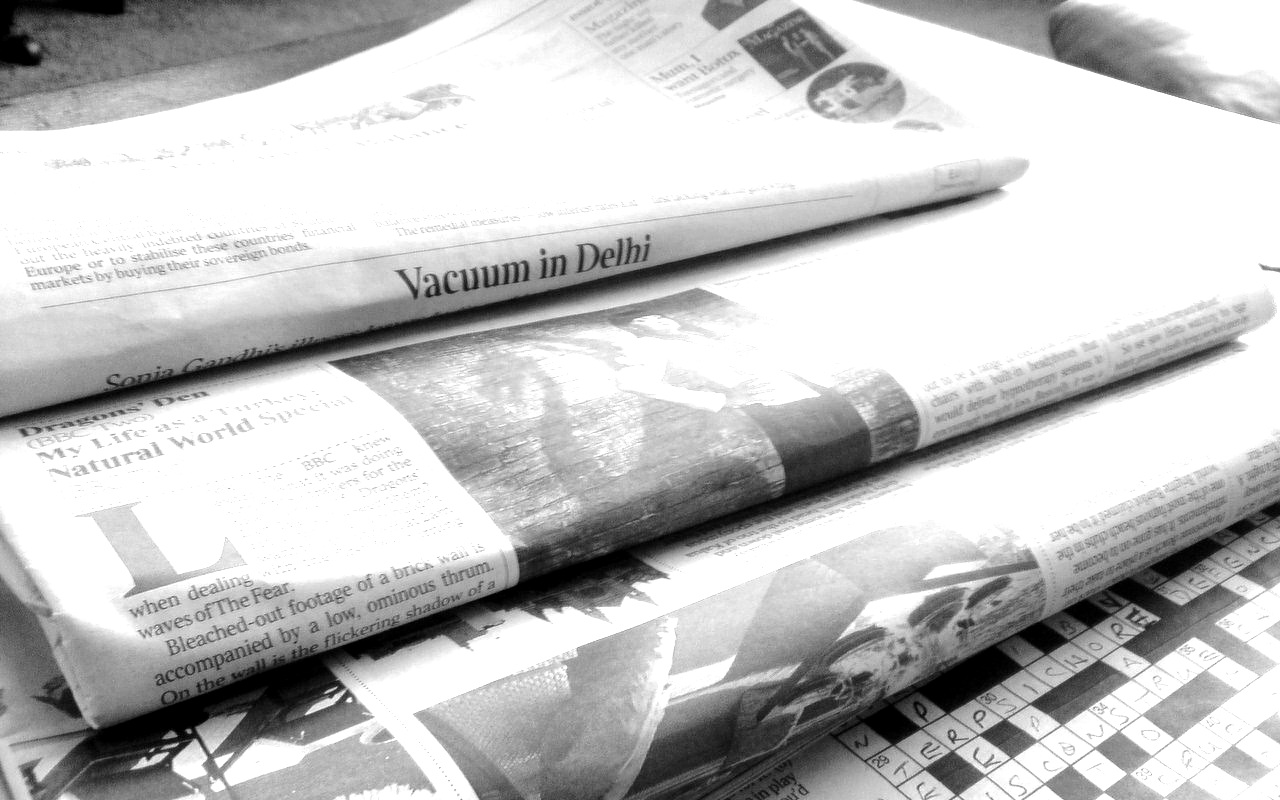
Media is a major resource in the public relations career especially in news networks. That is why as a public relations specialist, having proper information is very important, and crucial to the society as a whole.

=== Spin ===
Spin has been interpreted historically to mean overt deceit that is meant to manipulate the public, but since the 1950s has shifted to describing a "polishing of the truth." Today, spin refers to providing a certain interpretation of information meant to sway public opinion. Companies may use spin to create the appearance of the company or other events are going in a slightly different direction than they actually are. Within the field of public relations, spin is seen as a derogatory term, interpreted by professionals as meaning blatant deceit and manipulation. Skilled practitioners of spin are sometimes called "spin doctors."

In Stuart Ewen's PR! A Social History of Spin, he argues that public relations can be a real menace to democracy as it renders the public discourse powerless. Corporations are able to hire public relations professionals and transmit their messages through the media channels and exercise a huge amount of influence upon the individual who is defenseless against such a powerful force. He claims that public relations is a weapon for capitalist deception and the best way to resist is to become media literate and use critical thinking when interpreting the various mediated messages.

According to Jim Hoggan, "public relations is not by definition 'spin'. Public relations is the art of building good relationships. You do that most effectively by earning trust and goodwill among those who are important to you and your business... Spin is to public relations what manipulation is to interpersonal communications. It's a diversion whose primary effect is ultimately to undermine the central goal of building trust and nurturing a good relationship."

The techniques of spin include selectively presenting facts and quotes that support ideal positions (cherry picking), the so-called "non-denial denial", phrasing that in a way presumes unproven truths, euphemisms for drawing attention away from items considered distasteful, and ambiguity in public statements. Another spin technique involves careful choice of timing in the release of certain news so it can take advantage of prominent events in the news.

=== Negative ===
Negative public relations, also called dark public relations (DPR), 'black hat PR' and in some earlier writing "Black PR", is a process of destroying the target's reputation and/or corporate identity. The objective in DPR is to discredit someone else, who may pose a threat to the client's business or be a political rival. DPR may rely on IT security, industrial espionage, social engineering and competitive intelligence. Common techniques include using dirty secrets from the target, producing misleading facts to fool a competitor. In politics, a decision to use negative PR is also known as negative campaigning.

=== Politics and civil society ===
In Propaganda (1928), Bernays argued that the manipulation of public opinion was a necessary part of democracy. In public relations, lobby groups are created to influence government policy, corporate policy or public opinion, typically in a way that benefits the sponsoring organization.

In fact, Bernays stresses that we are in fact dominated in almost every aspect of our lives, by a relatively small number of persons who have mastered the 'mental processes and social patterns of the masses,' which include our behavior, political and economic spheres or our morals. In theory, each individual chooses his own opinion on behavior and public issues. However, in practice, it is impossible for one to study all variables and approaches of a particular question and come to a conclusion without any external influence. This is the reason why the society has agreed upon an 'invisible government' to interpret on our behalf information and narrow the choice field to a more practical scale.

When a lobby group hides its true purpose and support base, it is known as a front group. Front groups are a form of astroturfing, because they intend to sway the public or the government without disclosing their financial connection to corporate or political interests. They create a fake grass-roots movement by giving the appearance of a trusted organization that serves the public, when they actually serve their sponsors.

Politicians also employ public relations professionals to help project their views, policies and even personalities to their best advantages.

=== Reputation laundering ===
Some PR firms perform reputation laundering services. In these situations, a client will hire a PR firm to conceal unethical, corrupt, or criminal behavior. The PR firm will supply services that improve the client's reputation and obscure the client's history, such as: arranging publication of positive press, coordinating donations to charities, arranging sponsorships and advertising (such as of sports teams), arranging attendance at major social events, and recommending prominent associations that the client can join. Other mechanisms employed by PR firms on behalf of the purportedly corrupt or criminal customers include fake social media accounts, blogs by fake personalities, or partisan op-eds.

Notable PR firms that have engaged in reputation laundering include British PR firm Bell Pottinger, which employed reputation laundering in support of clients such as Alexander Lukashenko, Bahrain, and the Pinochet Foundation. PR firms Havas, Publicis, and Qorvis were hired by Saudi Arabia to perform reputation laundering after 9/11 and the assassination of Jamal Khashoggi. Most beneficiaries of reputational laundering are politicians or politically affiliated individuals and organizations, but this type of PR can also be employed by businesses and non-politicians.

The United Kingdom government published reports stating that Russian oligarchs had been "extending patronage and building influence across a wide sphere of the British establishment" and had employed public relations firms that were "willing beneficiaries, contributing to a ‘reputation laundering' process".

=== Evaluation of ethics of persuasion ===
The T.A.R.E.S. is a five-point test that evaluates ethical persuasion and provides boundaries in persuasive practices:

- Truthfulness (of the message)
  - Is this communicating something factually true and accurate?
  - Does this downplay or diminish evidence?
  - Am I creating a false narrative or image?
  - Does this influence people to believe something that I do not believe myself?
- Authenticity (of the persuader):
  - Will people question my honesty or integrity from this?
  - Do I truly believe that what is being presented will benefit those who are reading?
  - Do I support or advocate in the statement, person, or product?
- Respect (for the persuadee):
  - Am I presenting statements in self-interest, or do I genuinely care about the issue, person, or product?
  - Is this presented to persuadees who are rational, self-thinking beings?
  - What ethical responsibility do I hold by presenting this information?
- Equity (of the persuasive appeal):
  - Is this appeal fair and nondiscriminatory?
  - Have I target persuadees who are not capable of understanding the claims and the context?
  - Are the statements I present sensitive to various interests, needs, or concerns of the persuadees?
- Social responsibility (for the common good):
  - Have I unfairly stereotyped groups of society in my statements or actions?
  - Will my statements or actions cause harms to various groups of society?
  - Will there be any negative consequences against a group in society based on my statements or actions?
  - Have I fairly presented issues that concern groups who may have been underrepresented in society?
  - Are the statements or actions that are being communicated responsible to various societal groups, public interest, and the public?

== See also ==
- Brand management
- Grassroots
- Impression management
- List of press release agencies
- List of public relations journals
- Media intelligence
- Media manipulation
- Promotion (marketing)
- Public affairs industry
- Public relations in India
- Publicist
- Reputation management
- Sportswashing
- Crisis Management
- Damage Control
