= White monopoly capital =

Political term in South Africa

White monopoly capital is a term that originated in South Africa and is often used to describe a perceived concentration of economic power and wealth among White South Africans. It suggests that a small number of white-owned businesses (in an oligopoly) dominate various sectors of the South African economy, thereby controlling significant resources and influencing economic policies to their advantage. The term gained mainstream notoriety in 2016 when it was used by President Jacob Zuma, and media interests allied to the controversial Gupta family, to criticize those in the business sector calling for his resignation due to corruption and his connection to the Guptas.

The term gained prominence during the anti-apartheid struggle in South Africa and has continued to be debated and discussed in political and economic circles. Proponents of the concept argue that historical factors, such as apartheid policies that favored white individuals and businesses, have led to an enduring wealth inequality in South Africa. They believe that white-owned businesses continue to hold a disproportionate share of wealth and resources, impeding the economic empowerment of the majority black population.

Critics of the term, however, argue that it oversimplifies the complex dynamics of economic power and can perpetuate racial divisions. They argue that the South African economy has become more diversified since the end of apartheid, with significant Black Economic Empowerment initiatives and the rise of a black middle class. They also note that the concept of "white monopoly capital" fails to acknowledge the growing number of black-owned businesses and the role they play in the economy.

== History of the phrase ==
Academic Christopher Malikane claims that the phrase ‘white monopoly capital’ has been used many times by South African politicians and dates back to the early 1950s during the liberation struggle. The phrase gained contemporary notoriety when it gained widespread use in 2016. Former president Jacob Zuma used the term to reject calls for him to step down as president amidst corruption allegations against him involving his relationship to the controversial Gupta family. Zuma stated that a “big business” and a “foreign chamber” were calling for his resignation.

Critics of the term have claimed that it is not known who or what the phrase actually refers to and its existence is disputed (by former South African finance minister Trevor Manual, former president Thabo Mbeki and the Gauteng branch of the ANC). Proponents of the term such as Pieter Bosch Botha, the Economic Freedom Fighters and Black First Land First argue that, despite Bell Pottinger's campaign, 'white monopoly capital' does exist in modern-day South Africa. On 19 March 2017, the South African Sunday Times alleged that public relations agency Bell Pottinger was behind a social media strategy, using fake bloggers, commentators and Twitter users in an attempt to influence public opinion and sow racial division in South Africa, as well as targeting media and personalities that were opposed to the Gupta family. The term was also used in a fake news campaign by levelling accusations against government ministers regarded as hostile to Gupta interests, notably then Finance Minister Pravin Gordhan, by accusing them of promoting state capture for "white monopoly capital".

South African academic Roger Southall argues that although the term is "bad sociology, worse economics" its use in South African politics is useful as a reminder of the extremes of racialised economic inequality in the country.

== Bell Pottinger campaign ==
The aim of the campaign was to portray the Gupta family as victims of a conspiracy involving "white monopoly capital" to deflect accusations and evidence of their client's involvement in corruption and state capture, and to suggest that "white monopoly capital" is actively blocking transformation in South Africa.

The allegations were denied by Victoria Geoghegan, a partner and director at Bell Pottinger. On 12 April 2017, it was reported that Bell Pottinger had dropped the Gupta family as a client, having previously been paid around £100,000 per month, reportedly citing "threatening" social media attacks and "insulting" allegations that it had incited racial tensions.

=== Guptaleaks ===
Pottinger's involvement with the Gupta Family was further highlighted in June 2017 when South African newspapers The Citizen and Sunday Times published several emails, allegedly between former South African President Jacob Zuma's son, Duduzane Zuma (and a close Gupta comrade) and Bell Pottinger, pointing to a ‘dirty’ public relations smear battle. They proposed that Hamza Farooqui (MD of WorldSpace in South Africa, and a partner to Gupta associate Salim Essa) would blame the former South African Deputy Finance Minister, Mr Mcebisi Jonas, of dishonesty and corruption. This alleged ‘dirty’ statement was formed by Bell Pottinger employee, Nick Lambert. The statement was earmarked for release soon after Mr Jonas said that he was offered a bribe by a Gupta family member to betray his boss, Pravin Gordhan. Mr Jonas denied this bribe and instead made a public announcement. The ‘dirty’ statement was never released after legal concerns were raised by Bell Pottinger's Victoria Geoghegan. Nick Lambert, senior advisor at Bell Pottinger, was also said to have prepared "key moments" for a speech by ANC Youth League leader Collen Maine. The speech included a quote "Those who want to disrupt the State of the Nation speech must prepare themselves for a civil war." Bell Pottinger initially denied any allegations of wrongdoing.

=== Consequences for Bell Pottinger ===
Bell Pottinger founder Lord Bell was said to have "left his own firm with key staff members, in apparent disgust over the plan"; Bell confirmed in July 2017 that the Oakbay actions had been a factor in his August 2016 departure.

In June 2017 the South Africa's Democratic Alliance criticised the country’s tourism board for working with Bell Pottinger "at the same time as the Guptas were paying them [Bell Pottinger] to sow division in South Africa" (the tourist board contract had been terminated, with the board denying this was for political reasons). The Democratic Alliance also complained about Bell Pottinger's actions to two UK PR bodies, the Public Relations and Communications Association (PRCA) and the Chartered Institute of Public Relations. DA spokesperson Phumzile van Damme said Bell Pottinger tried to divide and conquer South Africans by abusing racial tensions in a bid to keep controversial former South African President Jacob Zuma and his party, the African National Congress (ANC), in power despite ongoing reports of "State Capture" by the Gupta family. On 4 July, the PRCA acknowledged receipt of the Democratic Alliance's complaint, and on 13 July said it had also received written observations in response from Bell Pottinger.

On 30 June 2017, Bell Pottinger announced that it was hiring Herbert Smith Freehills to review its dealing with Oakbay Investments in light of the allegations made against Bell Pottinger that it intentionally aggravated racial tensions in South Africa in an effort to deflect attention away from its client. On 6 July 2017 Bell Pottinger CEO James Henderson issued an apology and announced that it had "dismissed the lead partner involved [in the Oakbay portfolio] and suspended another partner and two employees so that [they] can determine their precise role in what took place." This came following initial findings from the Herbert Smith Freehills investigation. The dismissed lead partner was Victoria Geoghegan.
