= Lobbying in the United Kingdom =

Lobbying in the United Kingdom plays a significant role in the formation of legislation and a wide variety of commercial organisations, lobby groups "lobby" for particular policies and decisions by Parliament and other political organs at national, regional and local levels.

The phrase "lobbying" comes from the gathering of Members of Parliament and peers in the hallways (or lobbies) of Houses of Parliament before and after parliamentary debates. The now-defunct UK Public Affairs Council (UKPAC) defined lobbying as:

in a professional capacity, attempting to influence, or advising those who wish to influence, the UK Government, Parliament, the devolved legislatures or administrations, regional or local government or other public bodies on any matter within their competence.

Formal procedures enable individual members of the public to lobby their Member of Parliament but most lobbying activity centres on corporate, charity and trade association lobbying, where organisations seek to amend government policy through advocacy.

Companies and individuals who operate in this sector commonly use the terms "public relations", "public affairs", "political consultancy" or "corporate affairs" to describe their activities (though this was also a reaction to the negative publicity surrounding the word "lobbyists" following the 1994 Cash-for-questions affair). Professional public affairs agencies, representing multiple clients, undertake a significant proportion of lobbying activity in addition to individual organisations conducting lobbying on an in-house basis.

Lobbying in the United Kingdom has also been shaped by recurring Westminster financial-integrity scandals. Since 2009, controversies over parliamentary expenses, cash-for-influence, paid advocacy, post-government employment and MPs' outside work have repeatedly tested the boundary between the statutory lobbying regime and Parliament's own standards system.

== Summary ==
The professional lobbying industry has been rapidly growing since the mid-1990s and in 2007 was estimated to be worth £1.9 billion, employing 14,000 people. The report also suggested that some MPs are approached over 100 times a week by lobbyists.

Since 1994 there have been various complaints by MPs about unacceptable lobbying and several police investigations. Current levels of lobbying are causing concern as is the so-called "revolving door" by which industry professionals move rapidly between legislative and commercial roles in the same sectors, creating potential conflict of interests. Ministers are making increasing use of Special Advisors (staff members employed by the minister personally, but paid for from the public purse) who are often selected from the related private sector industries and have sometimes been criticised for engaging in campaigning while still on the government payroll or for moving directly between lobbying roles and the advisor role.

In 2009 the House of Commons Public Administration Select Committee recommended creation of a statutory register of lobbying companies and activities (similar to the one required in the United States), but the government rejected that recommendation.

In 2014, Parliament passed the Transparency of Lobbying, Non-Party Campaigning and Trade Union Administration Act, requiring statutory registration of professional lobbyists. The Office of the Registrar of Consultant Lobbyists (ORCL) maintains the register as an independent statutory office.

In June 2015 the Chartered Institute of Public Relations (CIPR) launched the UK Lobbying Register to replace a joint voluntary register previously run in conjunction with The Public Relations Consultants Association and the Association of Professional Political Consultants.

== History ==
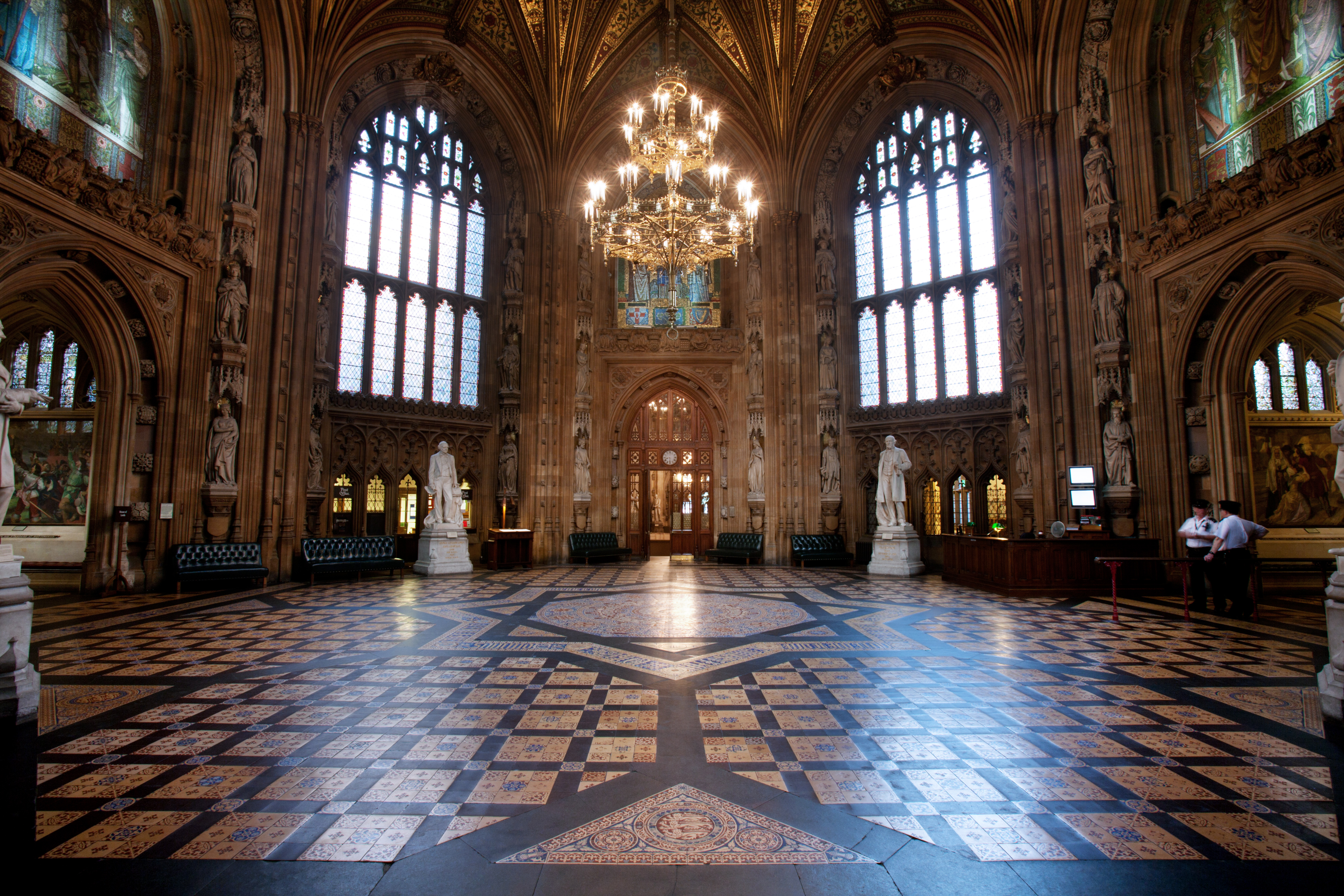
The lobby of the House of Lords and the House of Commons

=== 1800s to 1994 ===
During the 1800s petitions were a popular way of raising issues with parliament and in 1839, 13,657 public petitions were presented on more than 90 different subjects with a total of over 4.5 million signatures.

In 1866 a group of "Suffragists" unsuccessfully petitioned and lobbied parliament that women should have the same political rights as men. In 1903 the Suffragettes, whose motto was "Deeds not Words", heckled ministers, displayed banners, and used both violent and non-violent direct action; equal voting rights for women were achieved with the Representation of the People Act 1928.

In 1923, Winston Churchill acted as a highly paid lobbyist for Burmah Oil to persuade the British government to allow Burmah to have exclusive rights to Persian (Iraqi) oil resources, which were successfully granted.

=== 1994 to 2000 ===
In 1994, The Guardian reported that parliamentary lobbyist Ian Greer of Ian Greer Associates had bribed two Conservative Members of Parliament in exchange for their asking parliamentary questions (and performing other tasks) on behalf of Mohamed Al-Fayed in what became known as the Cash-for-questions affair. Following a lengthy legal case brought by Neil Hamilton and Greer and a parliamentary investigation it was found that "Mr Hamilton's conduct fell seriously and persistently below the standards which the House is entitled to expect of its Members." It was also found that Michael Brown MP had "failed to register an introduction payment in relation to US Tobacco" and had "persistently and deliberately failed to declare his interests in dealing with Ministers and officials over the Skoal Bandits issue." Others were also criticised.

Shortly before the 1997 general election, Bernie Ecclestone the head of Formula One donated £1 million to the Labour Party. After Labour's victory and a meeting between Ecclestone and Tony Blair, the Department of Health sought exemption for Formula One from the European Union's proposed ban on tobacco advertising. This event was cited as one of the reasons for the 2008 inquiry.

Jonathan Aitken, previously Minister of State for Defence Procurement under John Major in 1992 was jailed in 1999 in relation to the Arms-to-Iraq scandal. Prior to becoming minister he had been a director of an arms company BMARC, and after losing his seat at the 1997 election he was appointed as a representative for the arms company GEC-Marconi.

=== 2000 to 2010 ===
In Fuel on the Fire, Greg Muttitt argues that disclosed minutes from 2002 to 2003 (leading up to the war in Iraq) showed that many oil companies wanted a war in Iraq to seize Iraqi oil reserves. For example, BP allegedly said in the minutes that they "are desperate to get in", describing Iraq as "the big oil prospect".

In March 2007 the Select Committee on Standards and Privileges published a report following a complaint about the conduct of David Cameron regarding his "Leader's Group". The complaint related back to August 2007 when David Cameron's chief fundraiser used a researcher pass allotted to a Conservative peer (Lord Harris of Peckham) to gain access to facilities inside the Palace of Westminster. The committee also investigated a series of fundraising events which allowed donors to meet Cameron. The investigation concluded that it was improper to employ parliamentary staff for fund-raising purposes and that it was "ill-advised to link directly, in promoting the Leader's Group, the issues of access to his office and party fund-raising". Lord McNally, a member of the Lords Committee, said that this was "yet another example of how pressure on political parties to raise ever larger sums from private sources pollutes our politics". Using passes in this way does not however break any written rule.

A July 2007 freedom of information request showed that Heathrow Airport Holdings (BAA) executives met the Department for Transport 117 times between 2002 and 2007, including 24 meetings with the Secretary of State.

In October 2007 Lord Hoyle, a member of the House of Lords, was paid an undisclosed sum to introduce an arms lobbyist, a former RAF officer who worked for BAE Systems, to the Defence Minister, Lord Drayson. The lobbyist had also a security pass as a "research assistant" from another MP. Accepting money for introductions is "frowned on", but not illegal.

In 2008, supporters of the anti-aviation lobby group Plane Stupid managed to get onto the roof of the Palace of Westminster and dropped a banner reading 'BAA HQ' as a reference to the close relationship BAA had with government. Stunts such as this had become a relatively common lobbying tactic, having been used by Fathers for Justice previously. Prime Minister Gordon Brown referred to the stunt saying: "The message should go out today very clearly that decisions in this country should be made in the chamber of this House and not on the roof of this House". In January 2009 Labour MP John Grogan claimed there was an "intricate web" linking BAA, British Airways and Whitehall which had a direct influence on government policy resulting in the approval of a third runway at Heathrow Airport. Liberal Democrat MP, Susan Kramer MP said that Commons investigation was "a matter of public interest and is imperative."

In January 2009 The Sunday Times claimed that when a reporter had posed as a lobbyist that Lord Snape, Lord Moonie, Lord Taylor of Blackburn and Lord Truscott had offered to influence legislation in return for payment (main:Cash for influence). The Metropolitan Police said that no action would be taken, noting that "The application of the criminal law to members of the House of Lords in the circumstances that have arisen here is far from clear," and "there are very clear difficulties in gathering and adducing evidence in these circumstances in the context of parliamentary privilege." The House of Lords voted to suspend Lord Taylor and Lord Truscott for six months in the first such action since the 17th century.

In February 2010 there were several separate developments:

1. The Department for Transport were being investigated by the Information Commissioner's Office and could face a criminal investigation over allegations that it had deleted or concealed records re Heathrow to prevent them from being disclosed under the Freedom of Information Act. The investigation followed a complaint by Justine Greening MP.
2. Andrew MacKay, a conservative MP and previously a senior advisor to Cameron's team was reported to be joining the lobbying firm Burson-Marsteller after quitting parliament at the next election with a salary in excess of £100,000; His wife, Julie Kirkbride, also an MP was reported to be looking for a lobbying job as well at a similar salary. The couple were both stepping down at the next general election following their part in the MP's expenses scandal which they had claimed second-home allowances on separate houses. They had been ordered to repay £60,000.
3. Tom Watson complained of "unprecedented and relentless lobbying" around the Digital Economy Bill sponsored by Peter Mandelson. He suggested that over 100 people were probably working full-time to "bounce it" through parliament and possibly only two people representing the interests of the nation's youth. He observed that it was difficult when being lobbied by people you respect and admire. Lord Puttnam accused the government of attempting to push through the legislation without allowing for proper discussion, and that the bill as it stands was not fit for purpose.
4. David Cameron, the conservative leader predicted that it was "the next big scandal waiting to happen. It’s an issue that crosses party lines and has tainted our politics for too long, an issue that exposes the far-too-cosy relationship between politics, government, business and money". He suggested that he would shine "the light of transparency" on lobbying so that politics "comes clean about who is buying power and influence." Cameron himself had moved from the role of ministerial special adviser (first for Chancellor of the Exchequer Norman Lamont and then for Home Secretary Michael Howard) to become Director of Corporate Affairs at Carlton Communications at a time when the company bid successfully with Granada television for license with to launch the world's first Digital terrestrial television service (ONdigital - later branded ITV digital). Cameron resigned as a director of Carlton to run for parliament but remained on as a consultant to the company. During a 1998-round table discussion on the future of broadcasting he criticised the effect of overlapping different regulators on the industry.

In March 2010 Dispatches and The Sunday Times recorded four Members of Parliament offering lobbying in return for influence with the Cabinet. Stephen Byers, a former member of the cabinet was recorded as saying he would work for up to £5,000 a day and was like a "cab for hire".

In March 2010 the Advisory Committee on Business Appointments revealed that Tony Blair, who had resigned as prime minister and MP on 27 June 2007 had acted as a paid business consultant to an oil firm with interests in Iraq just 14 months after leaving office. In July 2008 he had requested to the committee that his relationship with UI Energy Corporation should be kept secret for reasons of "market sensitivity" and the committee agreed to postpone publication for three months against normal procedures; the committee then had to then "chase" Blair and send a formal letter to his office in November 2009, which he responded in February 2010 requesting continued secrecy. The committee chairman Lord Lang disagreed and the information was published on their website with the note "Publication delayed due to market sensitivities". The news raised concerns that he had profited financially from contacts he made during the Iraq war. Blair also earned money from the ruling family in Kuwait December 2007 for whom he produced a report on the oil state's future over the next 30 years for a reported £1,000,000 fee. A 2009 investigation by The Guardian found that he had put his multimillion-pound income through "an obscure partnership structure called Windrush Ventures, which enabled him to avoid publishing normal company accounts".

=== 2011 ===
In December 2011, The Independent newspaper reported that lobbying agency Bell Pottinger claimed to have been responsible for a variety of activities on behalf of clients that were considered not in the public interest including the manipulation of Google searches and Wikipedia pages. One allegation was that Bell Pottinger, acting on behalf of Dyson, used its influence with the Prime Minister and the Foreign Office to get the Prime Minister to raise concerns about counterfeit goods with the Chinese Prime Minister.

=== 2013 ===
"Two years ago anyone who had set foot in Conservative HQ could get a highly paid job, there was panic-hiring of Tories", said one lobbyist; however, with the Con-Lib coalition struggling and Labour ahead in opinion polls by about 10%, lobbying firms naturally wanted to boost their links with Labour: "About half the agencies I work with have specific requirements for people with Labour contacts."

== Regulation ==
In January 2009 the House of Commons Public Administration Select Committee published a report, Lobbying: Access and Influence in Whitehall, which contained the following conclusions and evidence:

- The practice of lobbying in order to influence political decisions is a legitimate and necessary part of the democratic process. Individuals and organisations reasonably want to influence decisions that may affect them, those around them, and their environment. Government in turn needs access to the knowledge and views that lobbying can bring.
- Evidence was given by Greenpeace of a revolving door where many former Members and Ministers now working for lobbying firms in particular for the nuclear sector. The report listed Geoffrey Norris (special policy adviser to Peter Mandelson), Jamie Reed, Jack Cunningham, Ian McCartney, Richard Caborn, Brian Wilson and Alan Donnelly. They also noted that some ran PR and lobbying firms including Alan Donnelly who runs Sovereign Strategy and employs Jack Cunningham.
- A complaint by Greenpeace into the access BAA had to the Department for Transport the committee said that while it welcomed wider engagement in the policy process it was important that engagement was even-handed and was seen to be even-handed, also that token engagement bred cynicism and was "worse than no engagement at all".

The report recommended "A statutory register of lobbying activity to bring greater transparency to the dealings between Whitehall decision makers and outside interests." It also concluded that the self-regulation of the professional lobbying industry was "fragmented" and appeared to "involve very little regulation of any substance". In October 2009 the government responded to the PASC report rejecting a mandatory register of lobby groups. Instead:

- All departments will have to publish online quarterly reports detailing ministerial meetings with interest groups and hospitality received by ministers and their advisers. Details of meetings between officials and outside groups will not have to be published.
- The list of civil servants who will have to publish details of hospitality and expenses will be extended
- The industry should be given more time to self-regulate (but there was no recommendation of a time after which self-regulation should be reviewed).

The Alliance for Lobbying Transparency criticised the decisions saying "self-regulation is no regulation"; they compared the situation to that of MPs Expenses scandal.

In August 2009 Transparency International UK received a grant from the Joseph Rowntree Charitable Trust to assess the level of corruption in the United Kingdom for the first time. One motivation for research, which is expected to take 12 months is the "anecdotal evidence and reports in the media suggest that: a) there is a widespread belief that certain institutions and processes within the United Kingdom are vulnerable to corruption, for example, funding of political parties".

Up to the Transparency of Lobbying, Non-party Campaigning and Trade Union Administration Act 2014 (the “Act”), the United Kingdom lobbying sector was mainly self-regulated by the UK Public Affairs Council. This was formed by the Association of Professional Political Consultants, the Public Relations Consultants Association and the Chartered Institute of Public Relations, and held its first meeting in July 2010, chaired by Elizabeth France. However, the PRCA resigned from the UKPAC less than 18 months later, in December 2011, citing concerns about the accuracy and completeness of the UKPAC's register of individual lobbyists.

The Act was first introduced in the House of Commons in 2013 and it came into force in full on 1 April 2015. However, the Act only requires the registration of consultant lobbying, as proscribes in Section 1 of the Act (For definition of Consultant lobbying, see Section 2 of the Act.) In addition to statutory registration, individual lobbyists or lobbying organizations can register at the UK Lobbying Register, which aims to promote transparency and professional standards in this industry.

=== Scotland ===
Since the Lobbying (Scotland) Act 2016, the Scottish Government and Members of the Scottish Parliament have been subject to stricter regulation, but even this legislation has large exemptions, such as exemptions for lobbying by telephone, email and letter.

== See also ==
- 2009 cash for influence scandal
- Greensill scandal
- Owen Paterson scandal
- Bribery Act 2010
- Cash for Honours
- Cash-for-questions affair
- List of pressure groups in the United Kingdom
- Reform of the House of Lords
- Political parties
- Revolving door
