= Timothy Bell, Baron Bell =

British advertising and public relations executive (1941–2019)

The Right Honourable The Lord Bell
- Bell in 2008

Member of the House of Lords
- Lord Temporal
- Life peerage 31 July 1998 – 25 August 2019

Personal details
- Born: Timothy John Leigh Bell; 18 October 1941 Southgate, London, England
- Died: 25 August 2019 (aged 77) London, England
- Party: Conservative
- Occupation: Advertising and public relations executive
- Known for: Campaign work for Margaret Thatcher

Timothy John Leigh Bell, Baron Bell (18 October 1941 – 25 August 2019), was a British advertising and public relations executive, best known for his advisory role in Margaret Thatcher's three successful general election campaigns and his co-founding and 30 years of heading agency, Bell Pottinger.

== Early life and career ==
Bell was born in Southgate, North London on 18 October 1941, to Belfast-born Arthur Leigh Bell, a Crosse & Blackwell sales representative, and Greta Mary Finlay, an Australian. His father left the family when his son was four, moving to South Africa and becoming a radio broadcaster known as "Uncle Paddy."

In 1952, his mother remarried Peter Pettit, the solicitor who had handled her divorce. Bell was educated at Osidge Primary School and Queen Elizabeth's Grammar School, Barnet, and joined ABC Weekend TV at 18 as a post boy. He worked in various advertising/PR firms in the late 60s including the London agency Colman Prentice & Varley and later Geers Gross, before helping to found and becoming managing director of Saatchi and Saatchi in 1970, later serving as chairman and managing director of Saatchi and Saatchi Compton from 1975.

On 19 November 1977, Bell was fined £50 for indecency. He had exposed himself while masturbating at his Hampstead bathroom window on 21 October in full view of female passers-by.

He left the Saatchis to join Frank Lowe and Geoff Howard-Spink in 1985 to have his name on the door at Lowe Howard-Spink and Bell where he served as deputy chairman. Later, in 1989 he bought out the PR division which became his own agency, Lowe Bell Communications, and he became chairman of Chime Communications in 1994 (which included the Bell Pottinger group).

== Thatcher years ==
Bell was instrumental in the Conservative general election campaign victories of Margaret Thatcher and was seen as Thatcher's "favourite spin-doctor and confidante." For her first 1979 victory, he developed the strategy for the 'Labour Isn't Working' campaign, created by Saatchi creative director Jeremy Sinclair and Bell advised the future Prime Minister on interview techniques, clothing, and even hairstyle choices. He also courted newspaper editors and worked on devastating attacks on the Labour Party.

In 1984, Bell was seconded to the National Coal Board to advise on media strategy at the start of the miners' strike. He worked on media relations and helped set the terms of the negotiations and course of government policy.

Bell was knighted in 1991 after nomination by Margaret Thatcher, and created a Life Peer after nomination as a Conservative working peer as Baron Bell of Belgravia in the City of Westminster on 31 July 1998. He was often later seen on panels and current affairs programmes discussing the issues of the day, and was chairman of the Conservative Party's Keep the £ Campaign. He also served on various arts and public administration bodies, including on the Board of Governors of the British Film Institute. On 8 April 2013 it was Bell who officially announced the news of Lady Thatcher's death.

== International work ==
Bell advised Hernán Büchi, a former minister of the Pinochet dictatorship, in the presidential election of 1989. Büchi eventually lost by a large margin to Patricio Aylwin.

Lord Bell, a friend of Russian tycoon Boris Berezovsky, handled the media attention behind poisoned Russian ex-spy Alexander Litvinenko, who died in hospital 23 November 2006. The Bell Pottinger Communications agency distributed a photograph showing a hairless Litvinenko in his hospital bed. The PR Agency also offered advice to relatives of Litvinenko and his spokesman Alex Goldfarb.

In December 2006, Lord Bell successfully lobbied on behalf of the Saudi government to discontinue the Serious Fraud Office investigation into alleged bribes in the Al Yamamah arms deal.

Lord Bell also performed public relations work for the authoritarian government of Belarus, and for the Pinochet Foundation (Fundación Pinochet).

In addition, he worked as an advisor to former Malaysian Prime Minister Mahathir Mohamad.

In late 2011, Bell's lobbying interests were investigated by the Bureau of Investigative Journalism for The Independent newspaper which reported claims that the company attempts to interfere with Google results to "drown" out coverage of human rights abuses, that his employees had altered English Wikipedia entries to create a better impression of clients and had easy access (via former Conservative MP Tim Collins) to the Cameron government and others overseas. Bell Pottinger, via a sting operation, were found to be willing to work for the authoritarian regime in Uzbekistan. Bell launched an internal inquiry, but believed he had been singled out for his connection with Mrs Thatcher.

Chime disposed of Bell Pottinger in June 2012 (while retaining a 25% stake in the business), when Bell also resigned as a director of Chime.

== Bell Pottinger exit ==
Bell Pottinger announced Lord Bell's departure as chairman to set up an advisory firm, Sans Frontières Associates, in August 2016. He retained a 7% stake in Bell Pottinger.

Tony Walford, partner at Green Square stated, "Perhaps not coincidentally, Sans Frontières was the original name of the public relations firm he set up before it was renamed Bell Pottinger; it was also the name of the unit that handled the firm's controversial lobbying and consultancy work for the governments of countries such as Belarus and Sri Lanka."

A "leading PR figure" told The Times that his resignation from his own agency didn't come as a surprise, saying: "Ultimately, he did not fit with the kind of corporate image Bell Pottinger wanted to project", in the end. Walford explained that, "there is big money to be made from representing governments and other entities, no matter how reviled they are. The problem is, this kind of activity sits increasingly uneasily with corporates keen on projecting a responsible image."

In January 2017, the Huffington Post reported that Johann Rupert, CEO of Remgro and Richemont, ended an 18-year-old contract with Bell Pottinger due to their 'concerted effort on social and other media to discredit him'. Rupert had spoken out against state capture and called on President Jacob Zuma to resign "for the sake of our children". As the Guptas back Zuma, Rupert asserted that Bell Pottinger painted him as the embodiment of "white monopoly capital" and as the counterweight to the Guptas and state capture, an example of how state capture allegedly worked under apartheid.

Eleven months after leaving Bell Pottinger and six days after the Public Relations and Communications Association (PRCA) acknowledged receipt of the Democratic Alliance's complaint, on, 11 July 2017, Bell announced for the first recorded time to PRWeek that he had left Bell Pottinger after raising his concerns about its "smelly" relationship with the Gupta family's Oakbay conglomerate in South Africa but that they had "completely ignored me"; Bell Pottinger denied his claims.

The PRCA expelled Bell Pottinger for at least five years from September 2017 for inflaming racial tensions in South Africa. The PRCA found Bell Pottinger guilty of four breaches of its code of conduct and dispensed its toughest possible punishment. PRCA director-general, Francis Ingham told the Financial Times, "This is the most blatant instance of unethical PR practice I’ve ever seen. Bell Pottinger's work has set back South Africa by possibly 10 years."

During a live Newsnight interview on 4 September 2017, Lord Bell mentioned that he was the most senior director at the several hour long initial meeting with the Guptas. Bell explained to Kirsty Wark that upon his return to London he told Bell Pottinger CEO James Henderson, "it's a very interesting piece of business but we can't handle it because there's a conflict of interest". Wark then read Bell his own email, dated 26 January 2016, stating, "The trip was a great success and we will put forward a deal whereby we will earn £100,000 per month plus costs and I will oversee this and make further reports." Wark asserted that the email was in "direct conflict with what you just said". Bell went on to deny this on the basis the email was sent before his return to London. Rather than oversee the deal, Bell claimed that upon his return "I did absolutely nothing", but Bell Pottinger "submitted a [fee] proposal". Bell went on to deny Wark's assertion that he is the senior figure working on the Gupta account, but rather he is a "father figure of the meeting". Wark asked that when Bell, as the founder of the company, stated that there was a conflict of interest, "nobody listens? Really?" Bell responded, "Nobody listens to me. That's why I left the company". Wark then produced a further Bell-authored email, dated 3 months later (April 2016), in which Bell offered further advice regarding the account. Bell retorted, "You can attack me all you like but I had nothing to do with getting this account."

Bell's Newsnight performance was pilloried by the UK press, with The Spectator labelling it, "Lord Bell's Newsnight PR disaster".

The Daily Express's take was, "Lord Bell was left red-faced after his phone rang twice while he was live on air during a Newsnight interview.".

An alternative view of what happened was published in The Drum on 5 September 2019. It stated Bell had a genuine desire to help the Indian-descended Guptas from being discriminated against in South Africa. However, Bell suffered a stroke in 2016 and was put on three months medical leave. CEO James Henderson used Bell's absence to ensure the account was run exclusively by his financial PR Team, under Victoria Geoghegan. Fake Twitter accounts were set up accusing white businessmen, such as Johann Rupert, of "white monopoly capital". When Bell returned from medical leave, he had a row with Henderson telling him he had to resign the account and when he refused, Bell resigned from the company. After the story broke in 2017, Johann Rupert claimed Bell was "the only person to have acted with honour in the entire affair."

== Cultural impact ==
In October 2014, he published his memoirs under the title Right or Wrong, in which he described his years in the industry and by the side of Margaret Thatcher. A first chapter was advanced by The Times newspaper.

The story of Bell's rise and fall is covered in Influence, a 2020 Canadian/South African documentary film directed by South African journalists Richard Poplak and Diana Neille, and described as a hugely detailed, unnerving exposé. The movie was selected as part of the official selection of the Sundance film festival in 2020.

== Personal life ==
Bell was married three times: first, in the 1960s, to Suzanne Cordran (marriage dissolved in 1985); in 1988 he married Virginia Hornbrook with whom he had a son and daughter (marriage dissolved in 2016); in 2017, he married Jacky Phillips.

Bell died from complications of vascular parkinsonism at his home in London, aged 77, on 25 August 2019.

== Arms ==
Coat of arms of Timothy Bell, Baron Bell
Crest An owl wings displayed and rising affronty Azure grasping in the dexter claw a trumpet bendwise Or. Escutcheon Azure two chevrons between three bells Or each charged with a crescent Sable. Supporters Dexter a labrador Sable supporting between the forelegs a trumpet bendwise sinister the bell upwards Or; sinister a labrador Or supporting a like trumpet bendwise Sable. Motto In Te Domine Spes (In Thee Lord Is Hope)
