= Tim Collins (politician) =

British politician (born 1964)

Tim Collins CBE

Shadow Secretary of State for Education
- In office 15 March 2004 – 6 May 2005
- Leader: Michael Howard
- Preceded by: Tim Yeo
- Succeeded by: David Cameron

Shadow Secretary of State for Transport
- In office 23 July 2002 – 10 November 2003
- Leader: Iain Duncan Smith
- Preceded by: Theresa May
- Succeeded by: Damian Green

Shadow Minister for the Cabinet Office
- In office 14 September 2001 – 23 July 2002
- Leader: Iain Duncan Smith
- Preceded by: Andrew Lansley
- Succeeded by: Francis Maude

Member of Parliament for Westmorland and Lonsdale
- In office 1 May 1997 – 11 April 2005
- Preceded by: Michael Jopling
- Succeeded by: Tim Farron

Personal details
- Born: 7 May 1964 (age 62) Epping, Essex, England
- Party: Conservative
- Children: 1
- Education: London School of Economics; King's College London

Timothy William George Collins, CBE (born 7 May 1964) is a British politician, once a prominent member of the Conservative Party. Collins was active in the 1990s and was later the Member of Parliament (MP) for Westmorland and Lonsdale in north-west England from 1997 until his defeat at the 2005 general election by Tim Farron, later leader of the Liberal Democrats.

== Education ==
Collins was educated at Chigwell School, the London School of Economics (BSc) and King's College London (MA).

== Political career ==
Collins had significant political experience before his election to Parliament. He acted as Press secretary to the then Prime Minister John Major, serving in that role during the successful 1992 general election campaign. He was a member of the 10 Downing Street Policy Unit and was a speechwriter to Margaret Thatcher, John Major, William Hague, David Hunt, Michael Howard, Chris Patten, Norman Fowler and Brian Mawhinney.

Collins was appointed a CBE in the Birthday Honours List in 1996, at the age of 32. The award was given 'for political services'.

According to The Almanac of British Politics, Collins was selected to fight Westmorland and Lonsdale, then considered a safe seat for the Conservatives, at 1997 general election "partly through his family's farming background, but more by his endorsement from John Major. When elected to parliament in 1997, Collins was the second youngest Conservative MP, after Graham Brady who was three years his junior.

During his time in Parliament, Collins served as a Whip and later as a Senior Vice Chairman of the Conservative Party. In this role, in the run up to the 2001 election, Collins was a senior aide to the then Conservative leader William Hague. Collins supported the focus on tax cuts and opposition to the Euro that characterised that campaign.

Following the election, the new Conservative leader Iain Duncan Smith appointed him to the shadow cabinet as Shadow Minister for the Cabinet Office later moving him to Shadow Secretary of State for Transport. When Michael Howard became leader in 2003 he was appointed Shadow Secretary of State for Education.

In this post, he developed policies to give anonymity for accused teachers until a court trial, to allow successful schools to expand and to stop the closure of schools for children with Special Educational Needs.

At the 2005 general election, he lost his seat to Liberal Democrat Tim Farron, by a margin of 267 votes. It has been suggested that this was due to a Liberal Democrat "decapitation" strategy which was aimed at unseating senior Conservative candidates.

In 2006, he was reported to be part of the so-called "A-List" of priority parliamentary candidates whom the Conservative leadership most wished to see in Parliament after the next general election, but, in April 2008, the ConservativeHome website reported that he left the Conservative candidate list, quoting him as saying "I firmly now do not wish to return to the House of Commons".

== Lobbyist ==
In October 2009, Collins was appointed Managing Director of Bell Pottinger Public Affairs, one of the UK's largest lobbying companies, replacing David Sowells and reporting to Chairman Peter Bingle. BPPA is part of Chime Communications plc, created and chaired by Lord Bell, the former advertising and communications adviser to Prime Minister Margaret Thatcher during the 1970s and 1980s. In the December 2009 edition of PA News, a magazine covering the lobbying industry, Shadow Arts Minister Ed Vaizey MP praised the hiring of Collins, saying he had "a huge brain" and would be "a huge asset" to the company. In the same issue, Charles Lewington, MD of consultancy Hanover, said it was "a smart hire by Tim Bell" while the man who beat Collins in 2005, Liberal Democrat MP Tim Farron, said it was "very good news for Bell Pottinger". In December 2011, The Independent claimed that Collins had been filmed by the Bureau of Investigative Journalism saying that PM David Cameron had raised a copyright issue with Chinese premier Wen Jiabao on behalf of Dyson Limited "because we asked him to".

== Television ==
Collins is a fan of the British science-fiction television programme Doctor Who, and has appeared on television several times to discuss the programme.

In a 2003 DVD documentary Putting the Shock into Earthshock (included as part of the BBC Worldwide DVD release of the Doctor Who serial Earthshock), he jokingly stated that the Cybermen were more convincing when the Conservatives were in power. He was also reported to have read The Dying Days in one sitting on the night of the 1997 general election so that he could claim to have read the whole New Adventures series while the Conservatives were in government.

Collins has also appeared as a guest on a number of current affairs programmes since leaving Parliament.

Parliament of the United Kingdom
Preceded by Michael Jopling	Member of Parliament for Westmorland and Lonsdale; 1997 – 2005	Succeeded by Tim Farron
