= UK Public Affairs Council =

- Founded: 2010; United Kingdom
- Founder: Association of Professional Political Consultants; Public Relations Consultants Association; Chartered Institute of Public Relations
- Defunct: 21 June 2016
- Fate: Dissolved
- Headquarters: United Kingdom
- Parent: Public Relations and Communications Association

The UK Public Affairs Council (UKPAC) was a United Kingdom organisation enabling self-regulation of individuals engaged in UK lobbying activities.

The UKPAC was established in 2010 by the Association of Professional Political Consultants, the Public Relations Consultants Association and the Chartered Institute of Public Relations (CIPR), and held its first meeting in July 2010, chaired by Elizabeth France. However, the PRCA resigned from the UKPAC less than 18 months later, in December 2011.

The UKPAC maintained a register of individual lobbyists, first published on 1 March 2011, though the initial completeness and accuracy of the web-based register was much criticised, and was a factor in the PRCA's resignation. The Alliance for Lobbying Transparency also criticised the register, saying an estimated 85-90% of lobbyists were shunning it, and highlighting criticisms by Austin Mitchell MP and others.

After the creation of a statutory registrar of consultant lobbyists (a provision of the Lobbying Act) in early 2015, the UKPAC closed in June 2015 and handed responsibility for its register of lobbyists to the CIPR. A 'UK Lobbying Register' was subsequently launched by the CIPR. UKPAC was officially dissolved on 21 June 2016.
