= Bell Pottinger =

British multinational public relations and marketing company

BPP Communications Ltd.
- Trade name: Bell Pottinger Private
- Type: Private
- Industry: Communications and reputation management
- Founded: 1998; 28 years ago, in London
- Defunct: 12 September 2017
- Fate: Bankruptcy
- Headquarters: London, United Kingdom
- Key people: Mark Smith (chairman); David Beck and David Wilson (Joint Managing Directors)
- Services: Public relations
- Revenue: £27 million (2016)
- Number of employees: 278 (2014)
- Subsidiaries: Pelham Bell Pottinger
- Website: bell-pottinger.co.uk

BPP Communications Ltd., which did business as Bell Pottinger Private, was a British multinational public relations, reputation management and marketing company headquartered in London, United Kingdom. On 12 September 2017 it went into administration (bankruptcy) as a consequence of a scandal caused by its activities to foment racial tensions in South Africa.

Bell Pottinger offered services such as lobbying, speech writing, reputation management, and search engine optimisation to clients including companies, governments and wealthy individuals. It was the largest UK-based public relations consultancy measured by 2010 fee income. Lord Bell, who advised Margaret Thatcher on media matters, was a co-founder of Bell Pottinger, which, until July 2012, was a wholly owned subsidiary of Chime Communications plc. In June 2012, Lord Bell and Bell Pottinger CEO James Henderson completed a £19.6 million management buyout from Chime, with Chime retaining a 25% stake in the business.

The firm was described as having "the most controversial client list" in the PR industry. It was criticised numerous times for conflict-of-interest edits that the company made on Wikipedia pages that involved or were about their clients. According to the Bureau of Investigative Journalism, the company was hired by the Pentagon to work in Iraq, making fake terror and news-style videos, targeting al-Qaeda, for the reported sum of $540 million.

During 2016 and 2017, a sustained "dirty campaign" by the firm came to light, in which it played on racial animosity in South Africa, including the creation of fake news, to benefit its client Oakbay Investments, which is controlled by the controversial and influential Gupta family in South Africa and had strong ties to the then President Zuma's government. In 2017, the resulting scandal saw the firm disgraced and expelled from its professional body. Chief executive and largest shareholder James Henderson departed, lead partner Victoria Geoghegan was fired, and Chime, its second-largest shareholder, wrote off its investment and departed. There was an exodus of major clients and other senior staff, with the result that many onlookers thought the UK firm was highly likely to close, while operations in the Middle and Far East could be sold to new owners. On 12 September 2017, it was announced that Bell Pottinger had entered administration, with some staff immediately being made redundant.

A September 2017 review by law firm Herbert Smith Freehills concluded that the firm had breached ethical standards, lacked appropriate policies for managing controversial accounts, and had brought the PR industry into disrepute, and the Public Relations and Communications Association (PRCA) said the firm had received a "damning indictment", having breached four of its conduct charter clauses. The firm had previously claimed that the allegations were purely a smear campaign having no truth to them.

Following the company's collapse owing creditors £14 million, administrator BDO was reported to be pursuing around 40 former Bell Pottinger partners to repay around £4 million, with Henderson asked to repay £400,000. In April 2019, BDO said it could bring lawsuits against former Bell Pottinger partners for their involvement in work for Oakbay, which breached partnership agreements. Former Bell Pottinger partners also faced potential disqualification from acting as company directors by the Insolvency Service.

== History ==
Bell Pottinger's origins go back to 1985, when Timothy Bell and Frank Lowe founded Lowe Bell as a subsidiary of Lowe Howard-Spink. Bell and Piers Pottinger bought out Lowe Bell in 1989, and it was subsequently floated in 1994 as Chime Communications plc but retained the name Lowe Bell on some of its subsidiary companies. In 1997, following Labour Party's victory in the general election, three of Lowe Bell employees – Neal Lawson, Ben Lucas and Jonathan Mendelsohn – left to launch their own agency, LLM Communications. In 1998, the subsidiaries were renamed as Bell Pottinger after Frank Lowe demanded that his name be removed. In 2000 the Bell Pottinger Group acquired Harvard Public Relations and QBO, which was renamed Bell Pottinger Public Relations. In 2001 Bell Pottinger acquired MMK in Germany and also The Smart Company, which was merged into Corporate Citizenship when the Group acquired it in 2007. In 2003 Resonate, a consumer public relations company was set up. In 2004 Bell Pottinger Communications USA was launched and in 2005 Bell Pottinger Middle East was launched with offices in Bahrain in 2009. In 2009 Bell Pottinger Change & Internal Communications was launched and Ptarmigan in Leeds was acquired by the Bell Pottinger Group.

In 2010 Pelham Public Relations, a financial public relations business founded by James Henderson, merged with Bell Pottinger Corporate and Financial. In 2011, the merged company was ranked 14th amongst global, and 8th amongst UK, M&A public relations advisers by Mergermarket, the Financial Times-owned mergers and acquisitions data company. The company's M&A work included acting for Northumbrian Water Group in its agreed acquisition by Cheung Kong Infrastructure Holdings, for Richemont in its acquisition of Net a Porter, Qatar Investment Authority in its acquisition of Harrods and for Universal Music in its acquisition of EMI Recorded Music. In 2012 it was the second biggest financial public relations company in the UK by volume of stock market listed clients, according to the Morningstar (formerly Hemscott) financial data group.

In May 2012, it was reported that Lord Bell had agreed a £20 million deal to buy most of the Bell Pottinger branded PR businesses from Chime, with Chime retaining a 25% stake in the venture and a seat on the board. The MBO was completed on 30 June 2012 with BPP Communications (Bell Pottinger Private) trading as an independent business from 1 July 2012. Chime retained the Good Relations group of PR businesses, including Harvard, Corporate Citizenship, MMK and Ptarmigan, and some UK regional offices formerly branded as Bell Pottinger were rebranded to Good Relations.

Bell Pottinger Private acquired Centreground Political Communications Limited, founded by former Tony Blair adviser Darren Murphy, in June 2014. In September that year, the company launched a new service aimed at the luxury sector.

In August 2016, it was announced that Lord Bell was quitting as Bell Pottinger chairman to set up an advisory firm, Sans Frontières. He retained a 7% stake in Bell Pottinger. He later (July 2017) claimed that he had left the company partly due to concerns over its "smelly" activities for a South African client, Oakbay Investments.

The Bell Pottinger Group had been ranked number one in the PRWeek and Marketing magazine league tables.

== Operations ==
Bell Pottinger had offices in London, North America, the Middle East and south-east Asia. It offered consumer, corporate and financial, healthcare, technology, industrial, public affairs, public sector, corporate social responsibility, internal communication, crisis and issues management services.

The Bell Pottinger Private Group included Pelham Bell Pottinger, Bell Pottinger Public Relations, Bell Pottinger Sans Frontières, Bell Pottinger Public Affairs, Bell Pottinger Middle East (offices in Dubai and Abu Dhabi), and Bell Pottinger USA.

Bell Pottinger donated £11,900 to the Conservative Party in the twelve months to September 2011.

In 2012, the company planned to enable clients to attempt to influence European Union legislative processes by organising participation in "European Citizens' Initiatives", a mechanism intended for grassroots involvement.

== Criticism ==
=== PR for countries with human rights violations ===
On 6 December 2011, the British national newspaper The Independent ran a front-page story based on covert filming by the Bureau of Investigative Journalism which the paper claimed revealed executives from Bell Pottinger boasting of ways in which they performed reputation laundering for countries accused of human rights violations. Posing as representatives of a fake investment body linked to the Uzbekistan government, the journalists had filmed a presentation at which Bell Pottinger executives explained techniques used on behalf of their clients, which at one point Tim Collins of Bell Pottinger – who has close connections with Prime Minister David Cameron, Edward Llewellyn, and Steve Hilton – referred to as "dark arts".

It was also reported that senior executives at Bell Pottinger told the undercover reporters that they had written a key speech given by the Sri Lankan President to the United Nations, in which he had described military action against Tamil Tiger separatists as "humanitarian". During a meeting with reporters, David Wilson – the chairman of Bell Pottinger Public Relations – had stated: "We had a team working in the President's office. We wrote the President's speech to the UN last year which was very well received... it went a long way to taking the country where it needed to go".

One of the techniques specifically mentioned by Collins was the use of search engine optimization to alter Google results. He said:

And where we want to get to – and this will take time, this is where David's team are magical – is you get to the point where even if they type in "Uzbek child labour" or "Uzbek human rights violation", some of the first results that come up are sites talking about what you guys are doing to address and improve that, not just the critical voices saying how terrible this all is.

After Syrian dictator Bashar al-Assad's crackdown on protestors during the Arab Spring, the Syrian first lady Asma al-Assad hired Bell Pottinger to run a PR campaign for her. This resulted in a Vogue cover and interview describing her as "the freshest and most magnetic of first ladies".

=== Connections with the British government ===
In a covert recording, the executives claimed to have access to or relationships with numerous senior British politicians, including Prime Minister David Cameron; the Chancellor of the Exchequer, George Osborne; David Cameron's former Director of Strategy, Steve Hilton; James Arbuthnot (chair of the Defence Select Committee); and MP Rory Stewart.

Collins also claimed that Bell Pottinger had been involved in David Cameron raising a matter with the Chinese government on behalf of a Bell Pottinger client, saying:

…Just as a final example just for you... I'm not saying we can always do this but just as an example of what we can sometimes do. Three weeks ago, we were rung up at 2.30 on a Friday afternoon by one of our clients, Dyson... They rang up and they said look, we've got a huge issue, and that is that a lot of our products are being completely ripped off in China, to the point where they're not just completely duplicating the product... (The) Chinese government won't take it seriously, it's half past two on a Friday afternoon. On Saturday, the Chinese Prime Minister is coming in for a UK visit – can you please get the UK to raise it?...And I'm pleased to say that on the Saturday, David Cameron raised it with the Chinese Prime Minister and showed him the photos of the products. I'm not saying we can do that all the time but that is an illustration of what, if you have the right message – David Cameron, yes he was doing it for Dyson, yes he was doing it because we asked him to do it, he was doing this also because he thought this was also in the UK wider national interest. This was something where there would be a UK proper interest. But in terms of very fast turnaround and getting things done right at the top of government, if you've got the right message, yes, we can do it.

The allegations of Bell Pottinger directly influencing the British Prime Minister and other senior Government figures on behalf of private sector clients led to calls from the opposition Labour Party for the Cabinet Secretary Sir Gus O'Donnell to launch an investigation, and from the Alliance for Lobbying Transparency for the immediate introduction of a statutory register of lobbyists.

=== Editing Wikipedia ===
In December 2011, Bell Pottinger came under public scrutiny after managers were secretly recorded talking to fake representatives of the Uzbek government and violating Wikipedia rules by removing negative information and replacing it with positive spin.

On 8 December 2011, the UK national newspaper The Daily Telegraph reported that some Wikipedia user accounts allegedly linked to Bell Pottinger had been suspended. Its report stated that "further claims published in the Independent today suggested that the company made hundreds of alterations to Wikipedia entries about its clients in the last year, some of them adding favourable comments and others removing negative comments. Alterations were said to have been made by a user – traced to a Bell Pottinger computer – who used the pseudonym 'Biggleswiki'." Among the articles edited by "Biggleswiki" was the Wikipedia entry for Dahabshiil, a funds transfer firm. On the same day, The Independent reported that Wikipedia co-founder Jimmy Wales had described Bell Pottinger as "ethically blind", after it had admitted altering Wikipedia pages relating to its clients.

On 9 December 2011, The Independent published further allegations, including that Bell Pottinger had targeted the Wikipedia entry of Gordon Brown's sister-in-law, the environmental campaigner Clare Rewcastle Brown, and the South African arms manufacturer the Paramount Group. On the same day, it was reported that a parliamentary investigation into lobbying firms, including Bell Pottinger, and their links with ministers, would be launched, and that an internal investigation had begun at Bell Pottinger.

In response to the articles published on 6 to 9 December 2011, Bell Pottinger lodged a complaint to the Press Complaints Commission (PCC) against the Independent, claiming that the information about its activities published by the newspaper had been obtained through subterfuge and was not of sufficient public interest to merit the Bureau of Investigative Journalism's undercover investigation. However, in its ruling, the PCC agreed with the Bureau that there was a "broad public interest in exploring the relationship between lobbying and politics" and that it would not have been possible to obtain details of the techniques used by the lobbying company through other means. The Bureau of Investigative Journalism's editor, Iain Overton, welcomed the PCC's ruling, saying: "During our undercover filming Bell Pottinger executives explained to us that one of the PR tools they used to attack news stories was to make an official complaint to the PCC. True to its word, Bell Pottinger went on the offensive following our exposé claiming foul".

In June 2014, Bell Pottinger was a notable absentee from a group of major agencies which publicly pledged to abide by Wikipedia's rules and end the practice of amending their clients' Wikipedia pages.

=== Fake terrorism-related media: propaganda campaign for US Department of Defense ===
It was revealed on 2 October 2016 that the United States Department of Defense (DoD) paid Bell Pottinger $540 million to create fake terrorist videos, fake news articles for Arab news channels and propaganda videos.

An investigation by the Bureau of Investigative Journalism revealed the details of the multimillion-pound operation. Bell Pottinger is understood to have been funded some $540 million from the DoD for five contracts from May 2007 to December 2011, according to The Times and the Bureau of Investigative Journalism. Its work during the Iraq War came under the U.S.'s Information Operations Task Force and Joint Psychological Operations Task Force. As part of the project Bell Pottinger created fake videos that were approved by General David Petraeus and that appeared to be the work of Al-Qaeda. It also created and distributed news stories that had the appearance of being produced by Arab media outlets. Lord Bell confirmed Bell Pottinger reported to the Pentagon, the CIA and the U.S. National Security Council on its work in Iraq.

=== Activities in South Africa ===
Bell Pottinger was accused of facilitating state capture by the Gupta family, in working to burnish the reputation of a family owned investment company, Oakbay Investments, with connections to former South African President Jacob Zuma. The accusations developed into a major South African political controversy, and led to further accusations of exploiting racial tensions in South Africa for commercial gain, the expulsion of the firm from its professional body, a mass exodus of clients, and, in September 2017, its closure.

==== Internet activities in 2016 and first clients depart ====
Bell Pottinger was introduced to the Guptas in January 2016 by Chris Geoghegan, father of Bell Pottinger executive Victoria Geoghegan, and a non-executive director of Rentokil Initial, and he received monthly fees totalling £120,000 from the agency for his services. In September 2017, he resigned from his role at Rentokil Initial.

In late February 2016, several internet-based sources were altered to be more favourable to the Guptas. These included activities in Wikipedia, Twitter, chat rooms, blogs and on news articles related to the Gupta family. It was considered (by the Mail and Guardian) that these alterations were part of "a concerted online counter-propaganda campaign launched on behalf of the Gupta family". After emails from servers associated with Gupta newspapers were leaked, Bell Pottinger was reported to have been involved in substantial editing of the Wikipedia page about the Guptas; a Bell Pottinger employee was said to have emailed much of the content to a Gupta account for it to be uploaded. The firm was also reported to have manipulated Wikipedia on behalf of its clients in South Africa in 2016, including Oakbay Investments, affecting the company's relationships with other agency customers.

After Business Day reported that Bell Pottinger had taken on Oakbay Investments as a client, Investec stopped using Bell Pottinger's services in March 2016.

In December 2016, it was reported that South African billionaire Johann Rupert had also dropped Bell Pottinger as the PR agency of Richemont. Rupert ended the contract after accusing Bell Pottinger of running a social media campaign against him, to divert attention away from persistent "state capture" allegations leveled at the Gupta family. In February 2017, Rupert alleged that Bell Pottinger had maliciously altered his Wikipedia page.

==== Exposure of plans, and resulting loss of reputation ====
On 19 March 2017, the South African Sunday Times alleged that Bell Pottinger was behind a social media strategy, using a network of fake bloggers, commentators and Twitter users, in an attempt to influence public opinion, exacerbate racism, and sow racial division in South Africa, as well as targeting media and personalities that were opposed to the Gupta family, on their clients' behalf. The aim of the campaign was to portray the Gupta family as victims of a conspiracy involving "white monopoly capital" to deflect accusations and evidence of their clients' involvement in corruption and state capture, and to suggest that "white monopoly capital" is actively blocking transformation in South Africa.

The allegations were denied by lead partner and Bell Pottinger director Victoria Geoghegan. On 12 April 2017, it was reported that Bell Pottinger had dropped the Gupta family as a client, having previously been paid around £100,000 per month, reportedly citing "threatening" social media attacks and "insulting" allegations that it had incited racial tensions.

Pottinger's involvement with the Gupta family was further highlighted in June 2017 when South African newspapers The Citizen and Sunday Times published several emails, allegedly between Jacob Zuma's son (and close Gupta comrade) Duduzane Zuma and Bell Pottinger, pointing to a "dirty" public relations smear battle. They proposed that Hamza Farooqui (MD of WorldSpace in South Africa, and a partner to Gupta associate Salim Essa) would accuse the former South African Deputy Finance Minister, Mcebisi Jonas, of dishonesty and corruption. This alleged "dirty" statement was formed by Bell Pottinger employee, Nick Lambert. The statement was earmarked for release soon after Jonas said that he was offered a bribe by a Gupta family member to betray his boss, Pravin Gordhan. Jonas refused this bribe and instead made a public announcement. The "dirty" statement was never released after legal concerns were raised by Bell Pottinger's Victoria Geoghegan. Nick Lambert, senior advisor at Bell Pottinger, was also said to have prepared "key moments" for a speech by African National Congress (ANC) Youth League leader Collen Maine. The speech included a quote "Those who want to disrupt the State of the Nation speech must prepare themselves for a civil war." Bell Pottinger initially denied any allegations of wrongdoing.

Lord Bell was said to have "left his own firm with key staff members, in apparent disgust over the plan"; Bell confirmed in July 2017 that the Oakbay actions had been a factor in his August 2016 departure.

In June 2017 the South Africa's Democratic Alliance criticised the country's tourism board for working with Bell Pottinger "at the same time as the Guptas were paying them [Bell Pottinger] to sow division in South Africa" (the tourist board contract had been terminated, with the board denying this was for political reasons). The Democratic Alliance also complained about Bell Pottinger's actions to two UK PR bodies, the Public Relations and Communications Association (PRCA) and the Chartered Institute of Public Relations (CIPR). DA spokesperson Phumzile van Damme said Bell Pottinger tried to divide and conquer South Africans by abusing racial tensions in a bid to keep Jacob Zuma and his party, the ANC, in power despite ongoing reports of "state capture" by the Gupta family. On 4 July, the PRCA acknowledged receipt of the Democratic Alliance's complaint, and on 13 July said it had also received written observations in response from Bell Pottinger.

The Guardian said that then-Democratic Alliance leader Mmusi Maimane had called for the PRCA to strip Bell Pottinger of its membership, with the matter to be considered by the PRCA's disciplinary committee on 18 August 2017; it also reported that clients were "considering leaving" Bell Pottinger "as clients do not want to be represented by PR firms that become the story or are associated with scandal". The PRCA said a final announcement would be made on or before the week commencing 4 September 2017. The Democratic Alliance later decided not to pursue the complaint laid with the CIPR.

On 30 June 2017, Bell Pottinger announced that it was hiring law firm Herbert Smith Freehills to review its dealing with Oakbay Investments in light of the allegations made against Bell Pottinger that it intentionally aggravated racial tensions in South Africa in an effort to deflect attention away from its client. On 6 July 2017 Bell Pottinger CEO James Henderson issued an apology and announced that it had "dismissed the lead partner involved [in the Oakbay portfolio] and suspended another partner and two employees so that [they] can determine their precise role in what took place." This came following initial findings from the Herbert Smith Freehills investigation. The dismissed lead partner was Victoria Geoghegan. The company also lost its second-largest investor (Chime), as well as experiencing an exodus of major clients and senior staff, due to the growing scandal. In September 2017 Herbert Smith Freehills concluded that the firm had breached ethical standards, lacked appropriate policies for managing controversial accounts, and had brought the PR industry into disrepute.

Reports that the complaint to the PRCA had been upheld appeared in the media on 24 August, before the official statement. Bell Pottinger appealed against the ruling, and James Henderson resigned around the weekend of 2–3 September 2017. On 4 September, the PRCA announced Bell Pottinger's expulsion. Francis Ingham, director-general of the PRCA, described the company's actions, which had incited racial hatred, as "absolutely unthinkable", saying Bell Pottinger had "brought the PR and communications industry into disrepute with its actions, and it has received the harshest possible sanctions." The PRCA said the firm had received a "damning indictment", having breached four of its conduct charter clauses. The firm had previously stated that the allegations were purely a smear campaign having no truth to them.

== Closure ==
Lord Bell, a founder of Bell Pottinger, told BBC Newsnight he believed it was unlikely the company could survive the damaging South Africa scandal. Following reports that Bell Pottinger had appointed accountancy firm BDO to find a buyer, on 7 September the BBC reported that staff had been told that the firm could go into administration by 15 September 2017. Subsequent reports suggested administration on 12 September, and so it proved, with some staff immediately being made redundant. In addition to staff who had previously left the firm, some in disgust at its South African work, around 180 partners and employees were reported to be losing their jobs.

BDO's efforts to retain any value in Bell Pottinger included seeking fees from rival companies if senior personnel left the company and took clients with them to a competitor or newly established business. From 40 partners at the end of August 2017, 10–15 remained by 25 September. Potential buyers of the disgraced company were reported to be deterred by high levels of debt on the firm's balance sheet; it had £15.7m-worth of liabilities at the end of August, including a £6.8m loan from a UK clearing bank. Legal firm Herbert Smith Freehills was reported to be owed nearly £1m when BDO presented a report to creditors on 10 November 2017. It was reported Bell Pottinger had made a £500,000 loss on estimated UK revenues of £27m in the year to December 2016; BDO prepared draft accounts for administration purposes showing a net loss of £572,000 on a group turnover of £37.5m in 2016. Bell Pottinger employed one staff member and two partners until the BDO report was prepared at the start of November 2017, but then had no employees.

=== Legal action ===
Shareholders were reported to be considering taking legal action against former Bell Pottinger directors for not disclosing the scale of the problem in South Africa, claiming that this non-disclosure affected their participation in a share buy-back in early 2017.

In January 2018, former Bell Pottinger partners were reported to be angry at the £900,000 fees paid to law firms and administrator BDO for winding down the company. Several senior staff also lost substantial sums to settle tax bills; up to 15 partners were said to have lost more than £1m. Two former partners – Nick Lambert and Victoria Geoghegan, both involved with the Oakbay project – were reported to be considering legal action, through lawyers Mishcon de Reya. Heather Kerzner (Henderson's partner) instructed London law firm Grosvenor Law to explore ways of clawing back some of her investment in Bell Pottinger.

In October 2018, the Times reported that around 40 former Bell Pottinger partners faced a £4m demand from the company's liquidator, BDO, with Henderson asked to repay £400,000. In April 2019, BDO said it could bring lawsuits against former Bell Pottinger partners for their involvement in work for Oakbay, which breached partnership agreements. BDO said it would talk to creditors, owed a combined £14m, about launching claims, adding that it could also sue Lord Bell over his comments to the BBC before the company's collapse. In October 2019, it was reported that 21 former Bell Pottinger partners had repaid £468,000; former CEO James Henderson was said to have disputed the amount requested by BDO. Bell Pottinger's creditors include Lloyds Bank – owed £5.1m. Repayments will also fund BDO fees, which in October 2019 totalled £1.2m.

In July 2020, it was reported that former Bell Pottinger partners including Henderson also faced potential disqualification from acting as company directors by the Insolvency Service under provisions of the Company Directors Disqualification Act 1986. Henderson vowed to fight any attempts to disqualify him. In November 2020, the Times reported that former partners at Bell Pottinger had yet to repay £1.8 million in "excess drawings" from the business prior to its collapse. Liquidators were also pursuing an unnamed partner for an additional sum, with litigation alleging breach of contract and "significant and related excess drawings". In March 2021, Lambert and Geoghegan failed in a legal action to avoid being banned from acting as company directors. Henderson was not part of this legal action, but had previously described the Insolvency Service's case against him as "weak and misconceived". In March 2023, the Insolvency Service dropped its case against Henderson, Geoghegan and Lambert.

=== Former employees ===
In early October 2017, 19 former Bell Pottinger staff joined a new unit within London public affairs firm Pagefield, senior partners John Sunnucks and Tim Collins set up a new business called Vico Partners, and Alex Bloxham and Jamie Lyons joined MHP. Before the end of October, a further five ex-Bell Pottinger staff had joined Pagefield, with others going to agencies including FleishmanHillard Fishburn, FTI Consulting, Lansons and Tulchan Communications.

In the meantime, the company's regional operations in the Far East and Middle East both split away from the parent firm. The 50-strong Far East business headquartered in Singapore, was rebranded as Klareco Communications (Klareco means "clarity" in Esperanto), following a management buyout led by Mark Worthington and Ang Shih Huei. Former chairman and co-founder Piers Pottinger resigned his position with immediate effect. On 20 November, City AM reported that BPME had been acquired by London-based Hanover Communications, adding 14 staff.

In January 2017, former Bell Pottinger London partner Jonathan Lehrle founded Sans Frontieres Associates; former Bell Pottinger staff Jerome Hasler and Philip Peck joined him.

In December 2017, Henderson was planning to launch a new business in 2018. In January 2018, J&H Communications Ltd (incorporated on 7 December 2017) was reported to be working for the prime minister of Turkey, and later for property tycoon Robert Tchenguiz. Henderson told PRWeek J&H would concentrate on "corporate, financial, brand, regulatory and reputation management" work.

In March 2019, Geoghegan joined risk management and corporate communications consultancy Thoburns, which also employed Lambert.

In June 2020, Consulum, founded by two former Bell Pottinger employees, Tim Ryan and Matthew Gunther Bushell, was appointed by the Hong Kong government to counter negative coverage of the territory in the international media.

=== Legacy ===
The collapse of Bell Pottinger is the subject of Influence, a 2020 Canadian/South African documentary film, described as "a hugely detailed, unnerving expose."

== Notable clients ==
- Abu Dhabi Airports Company
- Acacia Mining
- Adobe
- Aggreko
- Airbus: UK government relations
- AIX
- Arbuthnot Banking Group
- ASDA
- Asma al-Assad (wife of Syrian president Bashar al-Assad)
- BCA Marketplace
- The government of Bahrain.
- The government of Belarus
- Berwin Leighton Paisner
- Birds Eye
- Bloomsbury Publishing
- Boris Berezovsky
- Carillion
- Centrica
- Coca-Cola
- Cuadrilla Resources
- CYBG plc
- D&D London
- Dassault
- Deloitte
- DuPont
- DWF
- Dyson Ltd.
- EADS
- eBay
- Emirates:
- Ernst & Young UK
- Fortnum & Mason
- Friends Life
- Fresnillo
- GCM Resources
- Greybull Capital
- Hansard Global
- Rolf Harris
- Hays
- Health Promotion Board
- Trevor Hemmings
- Hickman and Rose
- Hitachi Capital (UK) plc
- HSBC
- Huawei
- IHG
- Imperial Brands
- Investec
- Johnston Press
- Lookers
- Alexander Lukashenko, President of Belarus
- Madrid Olympic Bid
- Kate and Gerry McCann (Note: The McCanns were initially advised by Bell Pottinger subsidiary Resonate, which had been retained by the Mark Warner holiday firm.)
- Milk Link: Since 2003.
- Missguided
- Mitie
- Molson Coors
- Mountain Warehouse
- Mulberry
- Multiplex Wembley
- NATS Holdings
- NHS
- O2
- Oakbay Investments
- Pan African Resources
- PayPoint
- Augusto Pinochet, Pinochet Foundation
- Pinsent Masons
- Oscar Pistorius
- Playtech
- Premier Oil
- Press Association
- Primary Health Properties
- Prudential
- Qatar Airways
- Reliance Industries
- Rentokil Initial
- Richemont
- RSA Insurance Group
- Ali Abdullah Saleh
- Sandell Asset Management
- Secure Trust Bank
- Sega Europe
- Severfield
- Siemens
- SOCO International
- South African Tourism
- The government of Sri Lanka.
- St James's Place
- TalkTalk Group
- Tarmac
- Tata group
- Temasek
- The Templeton Prize
- Tharisa
- TNS
- Trafigura (in relation to 2006 Ivory Coast toxic waste dump)
- Uber
- UNITE Group
- United Biscuits
- Veolia
- Virgin Media Business
- VisitScotland
- Volvo
- Waitrose
- AT&T Williams
- Zanaga mine
