= James Henderson (businessman) =

English businessman (born 1964)

- Born: James Brodie Henderson; 30 December 1964 (age 61); São Paulo, Brazil
- Education: Haileybury and Imperial Service College
- Alma mater: University of Buckingham
- Known for: Former chief executive of Bell Pottinger; former trustee of Children in Crisis
- Spouse: Alexandra Fisher (m. 1991; div. 2017)
- Partner: Heather Kerzner
- Children: 4

James Brodie Henderson (born 30 December 1964) is an English businessman working in the public relations sector. He founded a successful financial PR firm which merged with a Bell Pottinger company in 2010. Henderson subsequently became chief executive of the Bell Pottinger group, but was forced to resign in 2017 over a scandal relating to its work for a South African client and which also led to the company going into administration (bankruptcy), with the company's administrator later considering lawsuits against Henderson and other former Bell Pottinger partners. In January 2018, he founded J&H Communications Ltd.

== Early career ==
Born in São Paulo, the son of a Brazilian mother and English father, Henderson grew up in London's Kensington and attended Haileybury and Imperial Service College. He studied law at the University of Buckingham and then worked briefly for a London stockbroker before joining corporate PR firm College Hill (today, Instinctif) in December 1989 – first as a researcher, later as a PR executive – where he spent 14 years (not 12 years as one source suggests), leaving in August 2004.

Henderson then founded a financial PR consultancy, Pelham Public Relations, in November 2004, growing it to a 40-strong, £6m business before approaching Bell Pottinger Corporate and Financial to bring about a merger in 2010.

In the first half of 2011, the company was ranked 14th amongst global, and 8th amongst UK, M&A public relations advisers by Mergermarket, the Financial Times-owned mergers and acquisitions data company. The company's M&A work included acting for Northumbrian Water Group in its agreed acquisition by Cheung Kong Infrastructure Holdings, for Richemont in its acquisition of Net a Porter, Qatar Investment Authority in its acquisition of Harrods and for Universal Music in its acquisition of EMI Recorded Music.

In 2012, Henderson supported Lord Bell in a £20.5m management buy-out of Bell Pottinger from Chime Communications (the total deal value was £26.5m including an ancillary transaction to acquire the Pelham shareholding), with Henderson, holding a 25% equity stake, subsequently appointed group chief executive.

== Bell Pottinger ==
As chief executive of Bell Pottinger, Henderson had to defend the company against criticisms in 2011 of its Whitehall lobbying activities, while conceding the firm was at fault for editing Wikipedia entries (activity which pre-dated his time as CEO).

In 2016, Bell Pottinger was again reported to have manipulated Wikipedia and other social media, on behalf of clients in South Africa, notably the Gupta family-owned Oakbay Investments. In March 2017, it was alleged that Bell Pottinger was behind a social media campaign, using fake bloggers, commentators and Twitter users to influence public opinion and sow racial division in South Africa, as well as targeting media and personalities that were opposed to the Gupta family.

On 30 June 2017, Bell Pottinger announced that it was hiring Herbert Smith Freehills to review its dealing with Oakbay Investments. On 6 July 2017 Henderson issued an apology and announced that the firm had "dismissed the lead partner involved [in the Oakbay portfolio] and suspended another partner and two employees so that [they] can determine their precise role in what took place." However, following a complaint from South Africa's Democratic Alliance, the UK's Public Relations and Communications Association (PRCA) held a disciplinary hearing and on 4 September 2017 announced Bell Pottinger's expulsion. In the meantime, it emerged that Henderson had resigned just days before. Henderson said:

"I recognise the business requires a change of leadership to fix the problems of the past and to move forward. Although I neither initiated nor was involved in the Oakbay work, I accept that as CEO, I have ultimate executive responsibility for Bell Pottinger. I feel deeply let down by the colleagues who misled me. However, I think it is important I take proper accountability for what has happened."

By this stage, Bell Pottinger had appointed accountancy firm BDO to find a buyer, but the company went into administration on 12 September 2017, shedding all its staff by the end of November 2017.

Several employees questioned Henderson's management skills and suggested he became distracted by his then relationship with Heather Kerzner, 48, the ex-wife of the South African casino mogul Sol Kerzner and a friend of Sarah, Duchess of York. A former colleague claimed: "It all went to his head. If he saw a picture of himself [in the paper] he was delighted."

Henderson could yet be liable for the agency's actions. Shareholders were reported to be considering legal action against former Bell Pottinger directors for not disclosing the scale of the problem in South Africa, claiming that this non-disclosure affected their participation in a share buy-back in early 2017. Administrator BDO was reported to be pursuing around 40 former Bell Pottinger partners to repay around £4m, with Henderson asked to repay £400,000. In April 2019, BDO said it could bring lawsuits against former Bell Pottinger partners for their involvement in work for Oakbay, which breached partnership agreements. In October 2019, while 21 former Bell Pottinger partners had repaid £468,000, Henderson was reported to be disputing the amount requested by BDO. In November 2019, the Financial Times reported Henderson was prepared to pay a "materially lower" amount.

In July 2020, it was reported that Henderson and other former Bell Pottinger partners faced potential disqualification from acting as company directors by the Insolvency Service under provisions of the Company Directors Disqualification Act 1986. Henderson vowed to fight any attempts to disqualify him. In November 2020, the Times reported that former partners at Bell Pottinger had yet to repay £1.8 million in "excess drawings" from the business prior to its collapse. Liquidators were also pursuing an unnamed partner for an additional sum, with litigation alleging breach of contract and "significant and related excess drawings". In March 2021, two former Bell Pottinger partners, Nick Lambert and Victoria Geoghegan, failed in a legal action to avoid being banned from acting as company directors. Henderson was not part of this legal action, but had previously described the Insolvency Service's case against him as "weak and misconceived". In March 2023, Sky News reported the Insolvency Service had dropped its case against Henderson, Lambert and Geoghegan.

== After Bell Pottinger ==
In December 2017, it was reported that Henderson was "working for four or five clients" and planned to launch a new business in 2018. In January 2018, J&H Communications Ltd (incorporated on 7 December 2017) was reported to be working for the prime minister of Turkey, and later for property tycoon Robert Tchenguiz. Henderson told PRWeek J&H would concentrate on "corporate, financial, brand, regulatory and reputation management" work.

== Personal life ==
Henderson married Alexandra Fisher in 1991. They divorced in 2017. In the divorce settlement he lost his Clapham house, while the rest of his estimated £7m personal wealth was said to have been invested in Bell Pottinger.

Henderson was engaged to Heather Kerzner. She bought a 15% stake in Bell Pottinger shortly before the South African scandal erupted. Between them, Henderson and Kerzner jointly owned 37% of Bell Pottinger. On 9 September 2017, it was reported that their November wedding had been postponed.

Shortly after, Kerzner was reported to have hired lawyers Grosvenor Law to investigate how to regain some of her Bell Pottinger investment, despite such holdings being effectively worthless as the administrators would prioritise banks and other creditors ahead of equity shareholders. In December 2017, Kerzner took a stake of just under 50% in J&H, Henderson's new firm, but in April 2019 relinquished her significant shareholding.

Henderson's son, Felix, founded a student flat-finding hub called Bubble Student, part-funded by a loan from his father. In November 2019, the business had reportedly run out of money and been mothballed.

Henderson was a Trustee of Children in Crisis and is a past member of Brooks's.
