= Mr. Something Something =

- Origin: Toronto, Ontario, Canada
- Genre: Afrobeat
- Years active: 2003–2009
- Past members: Larry Graves; John MacLean; Paul MacDougall; Liam Smithand; Johan Hultqvist

Mr. Something Something was a Canadian Afrobeat collective, based in Toronto, Ontario. The band consists of five permanent members, including percussionist Larry Graves, tenor saxophonist John MacLean, guitarist Paul MacDougall, bassist Liam Smith and lead singer Johan Hultqvist, as well as loosely affiliated musicians, including jazz musicians such as Kevin Turcotte, Richard Underhill and Brian O'Kane. The band is known for their bicycle-powered outdoor concerts. Their songs often contained political content.

== History ==
Mr. Something Something was formed in 2003 by Graves and MacLean, who were childhood friends. The name Mr. Something Something is a play on the song "Mr. Follow Follow", by early afrobeat performer Fela Kuti, who has influenced the band's vocal style. Graves, MacLean and Hultqvist began writing music for the group. In 2004, they put out their first self-titled album.

The band's second album The Edge was released in 2005. It was nominated for a 2007 Juno Award in the World Music category. The 2007 release Deep Sleep was a collaboration with spoken word artist Ikwunga, an Afrobeat Poet. Deep Sleep was a frequently played world music album on Canadian college radio in 2007.

In conjunction with International Car-Free Day 2008 Mr. Something Something presented Canada's first bicycle powered concerts at the Evergreen Brickworks in Toronto's Don Valley and outside infamous bike thief Igor Kenk's defunct bicycle shop.

The band's album Shine Your Face was released in 2009. That year the band toured around Canada, including a performance at the Guelph Jazz Festival.

== Discography ==
- Mr. Something Something (World Records, 2004)
- The Edge (World Records, 2005)
- Deep Sleep (World Records, 2007)
- The Rough Guide to Afrobeat Revival (World Music Network, 2009)
- Shine Your Face (World Records, 2009)
