= Kenk =

Kenk is a surname. Notable people with the surname include:

- Igor Kenk (born 1959), Canadian criminal
- Roman Kenk (1898–1988), Slovenian zoologist
