= Kenk: A Graphic Portrait =

2010 non-fiction book by Richard Poplak

- Author: Richard Poplak
- Illustrator: Nick Marinkovich
- Publication date: 2010
- ISBN: 978-0986488405

Kenk: A Graphic Portrait is a book written by Richard Poplak about notorious Toronto bike thief Igor Kenk.

== Production ==
Kenk: A Graphic Portrait is published by Alex Jansen of Pop Sandbox, written by Richard Poplak, and illustrated by Nick Marinkovich, and with a release date that coincided with Igor Kenk's release from prison. To research the book, Poplack interviewed Kenk in the Don Jail in Toronto and travelled to his home country of Slovenia to interview Kenk's family and friends.

== Synopsis ==
The book documents the activities of Kenk in the Queen Street West area of Toronto, Canada. It is presented from the perspective of Kenk, and explains his actions and philosophy of survivalism and scavenging from society.

== Critical reception ==
Alex Good, writing in Quill & Quire remarked on the combination of journalism, film, and comic book, and notes the lack of critique of Kenk's narrative. Despite the critique, Good concludes that the book is "brilliantly executed" and described it as an "insightful, realistic portrait not just of a man but of a specific time and place."

Kim Nayyer, writing in the New York Journal of Books describes the books as captivating.

Shannon Winterstein, in her 2010 Broken Pencil review compared the combination of graphical novel and journalistic style to the work of Joe Sacco, Brian Michael Bendis, and Marc Andryko. Winterstein stated that the book was "arguably one of the best pieces of journalism released in recent years, graphic novel or otherwise."

In April 2010, the Globe and Mail named the book their Illustrated Book of the Week.
