= Westmorland and Lonsdale =

UK Parliament constituency (since 1983)

Coordinates: 54.312°N 2.880°W

- County constituency for the House of Commons
- Interactive map of boundaries since 2024
- Location within North West England
- County: Cumbria
- Electorate: 72,322 (March 2020)
- Major settlements: Grange-over-Sands, Kendal, Windermere, Ambleside, Kirkby Lonsdale

Current constituency
- Created: 1983
- Member of Parliament: Tim Farron (Liberal Democrats)
- Seats: One
- Created from: Morecambe and Lonsdale and Westmorland

Westmorland and Lonsdale is a constituency (Note: A county constituency (for the purposes of election expenses and type of returning officer).) in the south of Cumbria, represented in the House of Commons of the UK Parliament since 2005 by Tim Farron, the former leader of the Liberal Democrats (2015–2017).

Westmorland and Lonsdale is the Liberal Democrats' longest continuously held seat in England, as the only English seat they have won in every election since 2005.

== Constituency profile ==
Created in 1983, the seat is named after the historic county of Westmorland and the Lancashire Hundred of Lonsdale, both of which extend beyond the bounds of the constituency. Important towns by size in the constituency include Kendal, Windermere and Appleby-in-Westmorland. This is one of a minority of rural seats where residents voted to remain in the European Union in 2016.

== Boundaries ==
=== Historic ===
1983–1997:

The District of Eden wards of:

- Kirkby Stephen
- Orton with Tebay
- Ravenstonedale
- Shap

and the District of South Lakeland wards of:

- Arnside
- Beetham
- Broughton
- Burneside
- Burton and Holme
- Cartmel
- Cartmel Fell
- Colton and Haverthwaite
- Coniston
- Crake Valley
- Endmoor
- Grange
- Hawkshead
- Holker
- Hutton
- Kendal Castle
- Kendal Far Cross
- Kendal Fell
- Kendal Glebelands
- Kendal Heron Hill
- Kendal Highgate
- Kendal Mintsfeet
- Kendal Nether
- Kendal Oxenholme
- Kendal Stonecross
- Kendal Strickland
- Kendal Underley
- Kirkby Lonsdale
- Lakes Ambleside
- Lakes Grasmere
- Levens
- Lyth Valley
- Milnthorpe
- Sedbergh
- Staveley-in-Westmorland
- Whinfell
- Windermere Applethwaite
- Windermere Bowness North
- Windermere Bowness South
- Windermere Town

1997–2010: As above, excluding the District of Eden wards which were transferred to Penrith and The Border.

Map of boundaries 2010-2024

2010–2024:

The District of South Lakeland wards of:

- Arnside and Beetham
- Burneside
- Burton and Holme
- Cartmel
- Coniston
- Crooklands
- Grange
- Hawkshead
- Holker
- Kendal Castle
- Kendal Far Cross
- Kendal Fell
- Kendal Glebelands
- Kendal Heron Hill
- Kendal Highgate
- Kendal Kirkland
- Kendal Mintsfeet
- Kendal Nether
- Kendal Oxenholme
- Kendal Parks
- Kendal Stonecross
- Kendal Strickland
- Kendal Underley
- Kirkby Lonsdale
- Lakes Ambleside
- Lakes Grasmere
- Levens
- Lyth Valley
- Milnthorpe
- Natland
- Sedbergh
- Staveley-in-Cartmel
- Staveley-in-Westmorland
- Whinfell
- Windermere Applethwaite
- Windermere Bowness North
- Windermere Bowness South
- Windermere Town

This boundary change transferred Broughton-in-Furness to Barrow and Furness.

=== Current ===
The 2023 review of Westminster constituencies was carried out using the local authority structure as it existed in Cumbria on 1 December 2020 and is officially defined as:

The District of Eden wards of:

- Appleby (Appleby)
- Appleby (Bongate)
- Askham
- Brough
- Crosby Ravensworth
- Dacre
- Eamont
- Greystoke
- Kirkby Stephen
- Kirkby Thore
- Long Marton
- Morland
- Orton and Tebay
- Ravenstonedale
- Shap
- Ullswater
- Warcop

The District of South Lakeland wards of:

- Ambleside & Grasmere
- Bowness & Levens
- Broughton & Coniston (part)
- Cartmel
- Grange
- Kendal East
- Kendal North
- Kendal Rural
- Kendal South & Natland
- Kendal Town
- Kendal West
- Windermere

The constituency was expanded by adding parts of the former District of Eden, including the market towns of Appleby-in-Westmorland and Kirkby Stephen, previously in the abolished constituency of Penrith and The Border. To partly offset this, the former District of South Lakeland wards of Arnside & Milnthorpe, Burton & Crooklands, and Sedbergh & Kirkby Lonsdale were included in Morecambe and Lunesdale, thereby making the latter a cross-county boundary constituency.

With effect from 1 April 2023, the Districts of Eden and South Lakeland were abolished and absorbed into the new unitary authority of Westmorland and Furness. Consequently, the constituency now comprises the following wards of Westmorland and Furness from the 2024 general election:

- Appleby and Brough
- Bowness and Lyth
- Coniston and Hawkshead (nearly all)
- Eamont and Shap
- Eden and Lyvennet Vale
- Grange and Cartmel
- Greystoke and Ullswater
- Kendal Castle
- Kendal Highgate
- Kendal Nether
- Kendal South (majority)
- Kendal Strickland and Fell
- Kirkby Stephen and Tebay
- Levens and Crooklands (majority)
- Sedbergh and Kirkby Lonsdale (part)
- Upper Kent
- Windermere and Ambleside

The new constituency is made up of part of the previous constituency (41.7% by area and 72.3% by population of the new constituency) and part of the former Penrith and The Border constituency (58.3% by area and 27.7% by population of the new constituency).

== History ==
Having been a Conservative-dominated seat since its creation in 1983, the 1997 general election saw the Conservatives' majority cut to fewer than 5,000 votes. This was further reduced at the 2001 general election. In 2005, the constituency featured among a list of seats held by high-profile Conservatives (in this case Shadow Education Secretary Tim Collins) targeted by the Liberal Democrats by deploying supporters from across each region in what was referred in the media as a "decapitation strategy". In the 2005 election, Tim Farron gained the seat by a marginal majority of 267 votes.

At the 2010 general election, the local electorate caused the largest Conservative-to-Lib Dem swing nationally, of 11.1% — equally the lowest share of the vote for Labour (2.2%, one of five lost deposits for Labour), nationally. With 96.2% of votes cast for either the Conservative or Liberal Democrat candidates, Westmorland and Lonsdale had the highest combined share of the vote cast for the Coalition parties.

Contrasting with its long-term Conservative support, the combined Conservative/UKIP vote narrowly failed to reach 40% in 2015. Equally, Farron, who would become Leader of the Liberal Democrats two months later; was the only member of his party to secure an absolute majority (over 50%) of votes cast, after what was a poor result for the party nationwide with their seat count reduced from 57 seats to 8. In 2017 (when Farron was Lib Dem leader), Farron's majority fell to just 777 votes. However, in 2019, he was re-elected with a majority increased to 1,934.

Following boundary changes, it was estimated that the reconfigured Westmorland and Lonsdale would have been won by the Conservatives in 2019 with a majority of over 5,000. Despite this, the 2024 general election saw a large increase in Farron's majority to 21,472, the 3rd largest majority of all UK constituencies in the election behind Bootle and Hornsey and Friern Barnet. By many measures — the total votes cast, the size of the majority, and the margin of victory — this was the Liberal Democrats' strongest result nationwide. It was also the only constituency where the Labour candidate lost their deposit by polling less than 5% of the vote.

== Members of Parliament ==
Election	Member	Party
1983	Michael Jopling	Conservative
1997	Tim Collins	Conservative
2005	Tim Farron	Liberal Democrats

== Elections ==
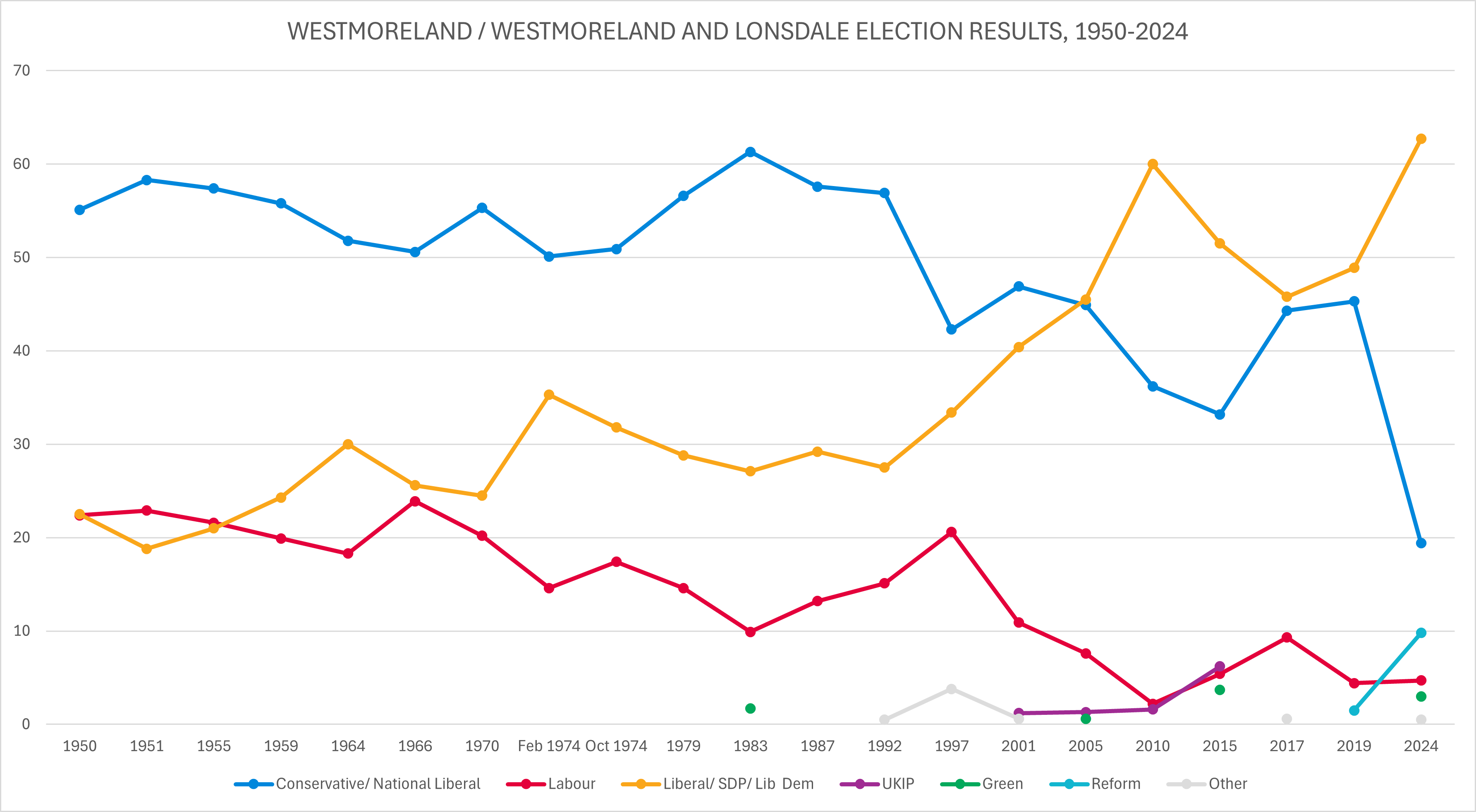
Election results 1950-2024

=== Elections in the 2020s ===
General election 2024: Westmorland and Lonsdale
Party	Candidate	Votes	%	±%
Liberal Democrats	Tim Farron	31,061	62.7	+22.0
Conservative	Matty Jackman	9,589	19.4	−30.8
Reform	James Townley	4,842	9.8	+8.7
Labour	Pippa Smith	2,306	4.7	−2.2
Green	Phil Clayton	1,486	3.0	+2.5
Independent	John Studholme	111	0.2	New
Heritage	Izzy Solabarrieta	81	0.2	New
SDP	Wendy Long	57	0.1	New
Majority		21,472	43.3	+33.9
Turnout		49,533	68.8	–6.1
Registered electors		72,029		
Liberal Democrats gain from Conservative		Swing	+26.4	

The notional 2019 election result for the revised constituency was calculated to be a Conservative victory. Hence, the 2024 general election result was described as "Liberal Democrat gain from Conservative", although Liberal Democrat Tim Farron was re-elected in the seat he had served since 2005.

This seat was the only constituency where a Labour candidate lost their deposit having polled less than 5% of the vote.

2019 notional result
Party	Vote	%
Conservative	27,188	50.2
Liberal Democrats	22,048	40.7
Labour	3,752	6.9
Brexit Party	601	1.1
Others	324	0.6
Green	287	0.5
Turnout	54,200	74.9
Electorate	72,322	

=== Elections in the 2010s ===
General election 2019: Westmorland and Lonsdale
Party	Candidate	Votes	%	±%
Liberal Democrats	Tim Farron	25,795	48.9	+3.1
Conservative	James Airey	23,861	45.3	+1.0
Labour	Phillip Black	2,293	4.4	−4.9
Brexit Party	Steven Bolton	763	1.5	New
Majority		1,934	3.6	+2.1
Turnout		52,712	77.8	−0.1
Registered electors		67,789		
Liberal Democrats hold		Swing	+1.1	

In 2019, Westmorland and Lonsdale was one of five English constituencies, the others being Esher and Walton, East Devon, Cheltenham and Winchester, where Labour failed to obtain over 5% of the vote and lost their deposit.

General election 2017: Westmorland and Lonsdale
Party	Candidate	Votes	%	±%
Liberal Democrats	Tim Farron	23,686	45.8	−5.7
Conservative	James Airey	22,909	44.3	+11.1
Labour	Eli Aldridge	4,783	9.3	+3.8
Independent	Mr Fishfinger	309	0.6	New
Majority		777	1.5	−16.8
Turnout		51,687	77.9	+3.6
Registered electors				
Liberal Democrats hold		Swing	−8.4	

General election 2015: Westmorland and Lonsdale
Party	Candidate	Votes	%	±%
Liberal Democrats	Tim Farron	25,194	51.5	−8.5
Conservative	Ann Myatt	16,245	33.2	−3.0
UKIP	Alan Piper	3,031	6.2	+4.6
Labour	John Bateson	2,661	5.4	+3.2
Green	Chris Loynes	1,798	3.7	New
Majority		8,949	18.3	−5.5
Turnout		48,929	74.3	−1.5
Registered electors				
Liberal Democrats hold		Swing	−2.8	

General election 2010: Westmorland and Lonsdale
Party	Candidate	Votes	%	±%
Liberal Democrats	Tim Farron	30,896	60.0	+13.9
Conservative	Gareth McKeever	18,632	36.2	−7.8
Labour	Jonathan Todd	1,158	2.2	−5.6
UKIP	John Mander	801	1.6	+0.2
Majority		12,264	23.8	+21.7
Turnout		51,487	75.8	+4.3
Registered electors		67,881		
Liberal Democrats hold		Swing	+10.9	

2005 notional result
Party	Vote	%
Liberal Democrats	21,873	46.1
Conservative	20,889	44.0
Labour	3,742	7.9
Others	969	2.0
Turnout	47,473	71.6
Electorate	66,342	

=== Elections in the 2000s ===
General election 2005: Westmorland and Lonsdale
Party	Candidate	Votes	%	±%
Liberal Democrats	Tim Farron	22,569	45.5	+5.1
Conservative	Tim Collins	22,302	44.9	−2.0
Labour	John Reardon	3,796	7.6	−3.3
UKIP	Robert Gibson	660	1.3	+0.1
Independent	Anthony Kemp	309	0.6	New
Majority		267	0.6	−5.9
Turnout		49,636	71.6	+3.8
Registered electors				
Liberal Democrats gain from Conservative		Swing	+3.5	

General election 2001: Westmorland and Lonsdale
Party	Candidate	Votes	%	±%
Conservative	Tim Collins	22,486	46.9	+4.6
Liberal Democrats	Tim Farron	19,339	40.4	+7.0
Labour	John Bateson	5,234	10.9	−9.7
UKIP	Robert Gibson	552	1.2	New
Independent	Timothy Bell	292	0.6	New
Majority		3,147	6.5	−2.6
Turnout		47,903	67.8	−6.3
Registered electors				
Conservative hold		Swing	−1.2	

=== Elections in the 1990s ===
General election 1997: Westmorland and Lonsdale
Party	Candidate	Votes	%	±%
Conservative	Tim Collins	21,463	42.3	−14.6
Liberal Democrats	Stanley Collins	16,942	33.4	+5.9
Labour	John Harding	10,452	20.6	+5.5
Referendum	Michael Smith	1,924	3.8	New
Majority		4,521	8.9	−20.5
Turnout		50,781	74.3	−3.2
Registered electors		68,389		
Conservative hold		Swing	−10.3	

1992 notional result
Party	Vote	%
Conservative	29,775	56.9
Liberal Democrats	14,381	27.5
Labour	7,898	15.1
Others	273	0.5
Turnout	52,327	77.5
Electorate	67,523	

General election 1992: Westmorland and Lonsdale
Party	Candidate	Votes	%	±%
Conservative	Michael Jopling	31,798	56.9	−0.7
Liberal Democrats	Stanley Collins	15,362	27.5	−1.7
Labour	Dickon Abbott	8,436	15.1	+1.9
Natural Law	Robert Johnstone	287	0.5	New
Majority		16,436	29.4	+1.0
Turnout		55,883	77.8	−3.0
Registered electors		71,865		
Conservative hold		Swing	+0.5	

=== Elections in the 1980s ===
General election 1987: Westmorland and Lonsdale
Party	Candidate	Votes	%	±%
Conservative	Michael Jopling	30,259	57.6	−3.7
Liberal	Stanley Collins	15,339	29.2	+2.1
Labour	Shaun Halfpenny	6,968	13.2	+3.3
Majority		14,920	28.4	−5.8
Turnout		52,566	74.8	+2.5
Registered electors		70,237		
Conservative hold		Swing	−2.9	

General election 1983: Westmorland and Lonsdale
Party	Candidate	Votes	%	±%
Conservative	Michael Jopling	29,775	61.3	+4.4
Liberal	Ken Hulls	13,188	27.1	–0.2
Labour	Chris Stott	4,798	9.9	–5.9
Ecology	Robert Gibson	805	1.7	New
Majority		16,587	34.2	+4.6
Turnout		48,566	72.3	
Registered electors		67,161		
Conservative hold		Swing	+2.3	

Note: The Robert Gibson who stood in this election and the similarly named candidate in 2001 and 2005 are not the same person.

1979 notional result
Party	Vote	%
Conservative	28,786	56.9
Liberal	13,813	27.3
Labour	7,986	15.8
Turnout	50,585	
Electorate		

== See also ==
- Parliamentary constituencies in Cumbria
