= Alliance for Lobbying Transparency =

UK group focused on government lobbying

The Alliance for Lobbying Transparency is a UK-based organisation formed in September 2007 and formally launched in January 2008 and concerned with the influence of lobbying on government decision-making.

The Alliance is also campaigning for a mandatory lobbyists register, while the UK Public Affairs Council is a lobby industry body supporting self-regulation. The UKPAC published its first register in March 2011 and the Alliance was immediately critical, saying an estimated 85-90% of lobbyists were shunning it, and highlighting condemnation by Austin Mitchell MP and others.

== Members ==
Alliance members include charities, campaign groups and a trade union.

- Action Aid
- Campaign Against Arms Trade
- Campaign for Press and Broadcasting Freedom
- Corporate Watch
- enough'senough.org
- Friends of the Earth
- Greenpeace
- National Union of Journalists
- Pesticide Action Network
- Platform
- SPEAK network
- SpinWatch (SpinWatch's director Tamasin Cave is sometimes quoted as head of the Alliance for Lobbying Transparency)
- Unlock Democracy
- War on Want
- World Development Movement

Some Alliance members are also supporters of a related European initiative, the Alliance for Lobbying Transparency and Ethics Regulation (ALTER-EU), a coalition concerned with corporate lobbyists' influence on the political agenda in Europe.

== Funding ==
The Alliance has received funding via a grant from the Joseph Rowntree Charitable Trust's Power and Responsibility programme, and gets support from coalition members.
