= Bob Leaf =

American public relations executive (1931–2021)

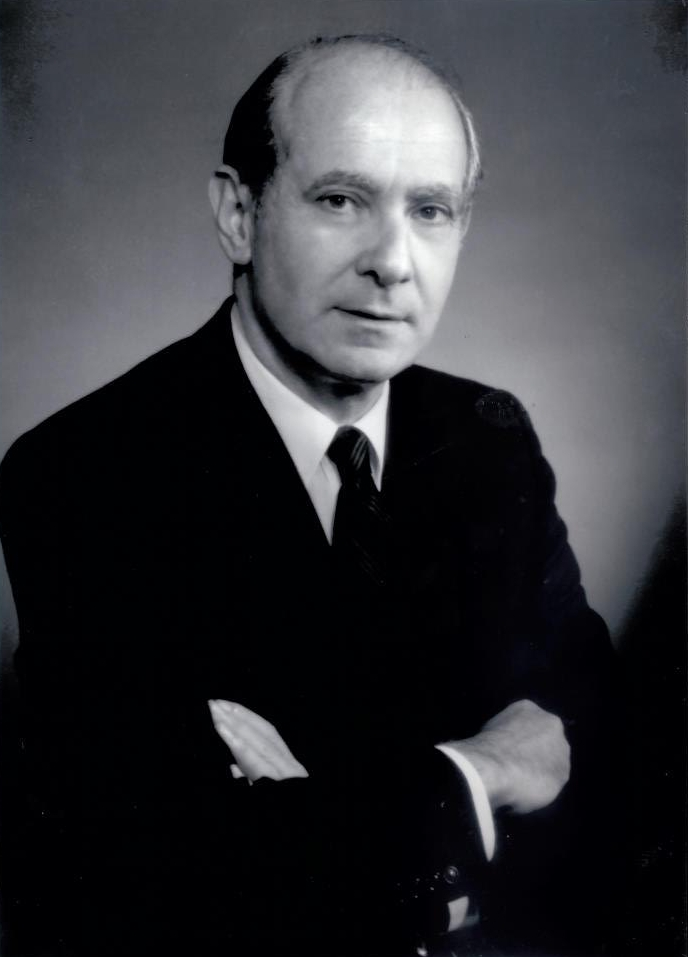
- Born: August 9, 1931; New York City, US
- Died: June 10, 2021 (aged 89)
- Education: University of Missouri
- Occupations: CEO Robert S Leaf Consultants; former International Chairman of Burson-Marsteller

Robert Stephen Leaf ( August 9, 1931 – June 10, 2021) was an American public relations executive. He is best known for creating the international network of offices which made Burson-Marsteller the world's largest public relations firm in the 1980s, where he eventually rose to be international chairman. Debrett's have recognised him as one of Britain's 500 most influential people.

== Early life ==
Leaf was born in New York City on August 9, 1931. He attended Stuyvesant High School in Manhattan.

=== Education ===
After high school Leaf enrolled in the School of Journalism at the University of Missouri, the world's first school of journalism. Initially he was interested in pursuing a career in sports journalism, but after attending classes in advertising and public relations he decided that was where his future lay. At college, Leaf also developed a keen interest in history and international relations and, after receiving his bachelor of journalism degree with honors in 1952, he received an MA with honors in history in 1954.

=== Army ===
After graduation, Leaf served in the United States Army for two years. After basic training, he was posted to Fort Eustis, Virginia for a few months, then army headquarters at Orléans, France as an information and education specialist, who lectured to the troops. Among his subjects were the different cultural attitudes they would encounter while stationed overseas, and how best to get on with the British, French and Germans.

== Burson-Marsteller ==
Leaf moved back to the United States in 1956 and went to live with his widowed mother in New York, while searching for a job. For a short while he worked for a show business publicist where his main clients included Milton Berle, who helped start television in the United States, Tony Bennett and Pearl Bailey. He then obtained an interview with a small PR firm called Burson-Marsteller which was looking for its first trainee, and got the job.

He joined Burson-Marsteller on July 1, 1957, alongside its then six executives. The business grew rapidly and soon Leaf was promoted and given assistants, one of whom was Mary Travers – soon far better known as the Mary in the vocal group Peter, Paul and Mary.

Harold Burson had also been stationed overseas in the army and felt that it offered great opportunities for the firm to represent American clients there. He appointed Leaf head of international operations and, in 1965, he was sent to Brussels on a one-year assignment. Three years later he was transferred to London, where he still resided.

=== Overseas growth ===
Credited as "the father of public relations", Leaf went on to create a global network of offices which helped Burson-Marsteller become the world's biggest PR firm during his tenure.

After giving a speech in Moscow, B-M was hired by Vneshtorgreklama, the Russian state advertising agency during the Cold War, and helped set up the first PR firm in the Soviet Union. Leaf also signed a partnership agreement with the Chinese government in the Great Hall of the People to establish the first official Chinese Government PR firm. He launched the first international PR firm in the Middle East and started Burson-Marsteller offices throughout Europe, Asia, South America and Australia.

In 1997, after 40 years with Burson-Marsteller, he stood down as their International chairman and established his own firm, Robert S. Leaf Consultants, which is based in the Burson-Marsteller building in London. He still advised Burson-Marsteller.

== Awards ==
In 2000, Leaf was given the Chartered Institute of Public Relations first ever 'Alan Campbell Award', for outstanding contributions to international public relations and, in 2011, he received journalism's highest award Missouri Honor Medal for Distinguished Service to Journalism from his alma mater, the University of Missouri. Previous recipients include Tom Brokaw, Walter Cronkite, George Gallup and Sir Winston Churchill. He is listed in Who's Who in America, Who's Who in the World, Debrett's People of Today. In January 2014, he was included in 'The Debrett's 500', a list of people considered by them as Britain's 500 most influential people.

== Books ==
In 2012, Leaf published his memoirs, The Art of Perception. It was described in The Reality Gap as:

an important read for anyone in or wanting to be in the PR business, and an entertaining read for anyone interested in international business growth at the sharp end.

Since the publication of the book, Leaf has been spending his time talking at conferences and lecturing at leading business and journalism schools in the UK and the US.

He is also a founder of the Public Relations Consultants Association.

== Personal life ==
While still working at B-M's New York office Leaf received a phone call from Adele Ornstein, who had been a fellow student at Joan of Arc Junior High School in New York whom he had not seen in 12 years but hadn't forgotten, so they started dating. They were married in June 1958, their son, Stuart, was born in 1961 and they have two grandchildren.
