= Influence (film) =

2020 documentary film

- Directed by: Diana Neille; Richard Poplak
- Written by: Diana Neille; Richard Poplak
- Release date: 2020
- Countries: Canada; South Africa

Influence is a 2020 Canadian, South African documentary film written and directed by Diana Neille and Richard Poplak. The film follows Lord Tim Bell and his associates, known for their controversial geopolitical spin-doctoring.

It had its world premiere at the 2020 Sundance Film Festival on January 27, 2020. It was also entered in the Moscow International Film Festival and the Amplify Film Festival in the UK. It is in English and Spanish with English subtitles. It runs for 90 minutes. The production companies are StoryScope and EyeSteelFilm.

== Synopsis ==
This film focuses on the infamous Lord Tim Bell and his associates, known for their controversial geopolitical spin-doctoring. Bell, who started his career in advertising, had an affinity for difficult briefs and “people with problems,” as he liked to call them. He designed campaigns for unpopular politicians, dictators, disgraced companies, and celebrities the same way he put together product branding—by being concise and brutal. In 1987 he cofounded Bell Pottinger, which quickly became one of the most influential reputation-management companies in the world—until one of those campaigns incited racial division in South Africa and ruined BP’s reputation to a degree beyond spinning. Its cause of death was shrewdly described by The New York Times as “acute embarrassment.”

== Critical reception ==
Influence has a 78% rating on online review aggregator Rotten Tomatoes.

Reviewers have described Influence as a hugely detailed, unnerving expose. It is also considered hard to follow. Other critics generally liked the film.
