= Richard Poplak =

South African journalist, author and film maker

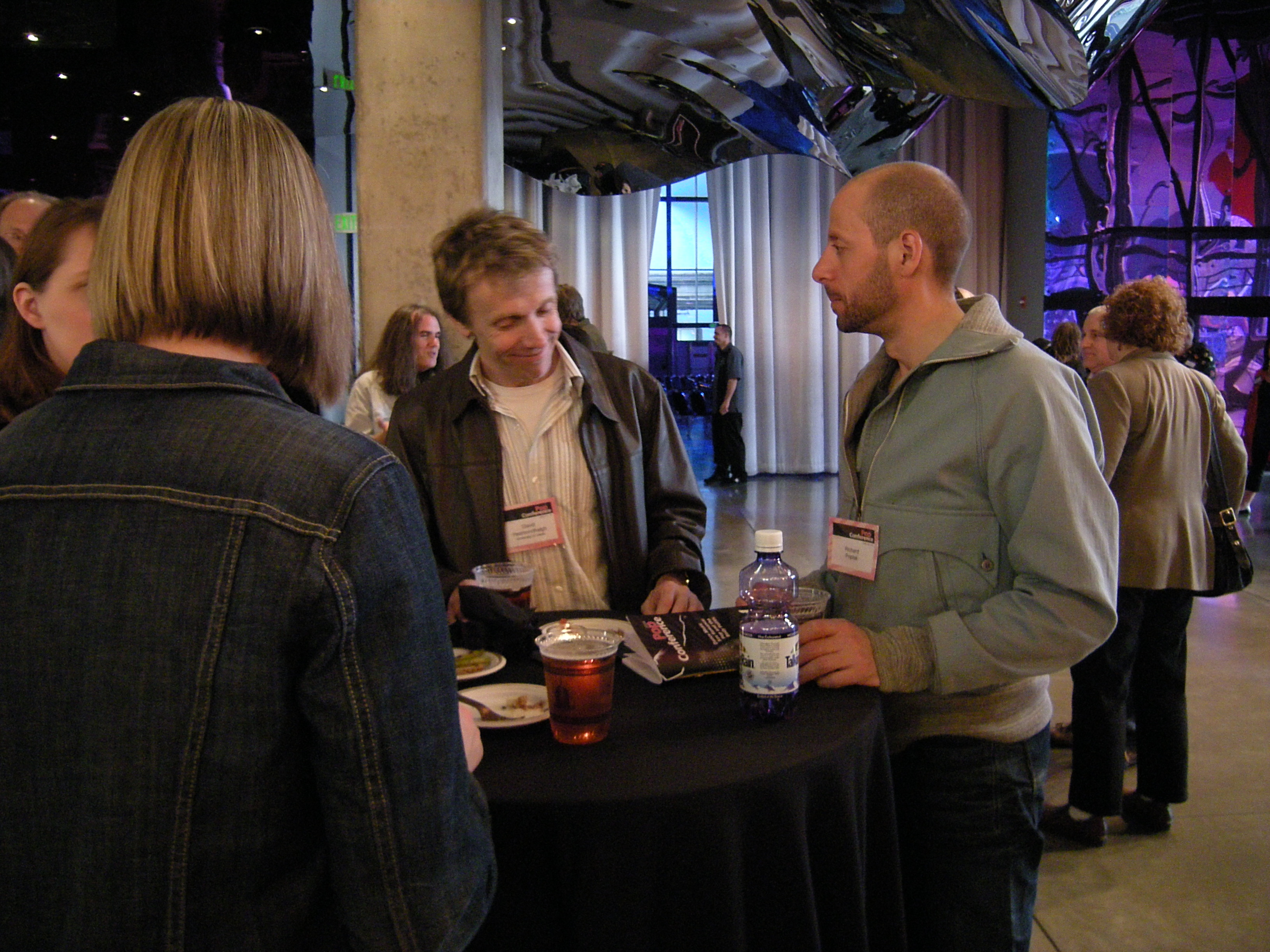
- Poplak (right) at the 2009 Pop Conference, Seattle
- Born: Johannesburg, South Africa
- Education: Concordia University
- Occupations: Journalist; director; author
- Notable work: Kenk: A Graphic Portrait; Influence
- Website: richardpoplak.com

Richard Poplak is a Johannesburg-based South African author, journalist and filmmaker who focuses on corporate criminality, race and equity issues.

He is the author of the 2011 graphic journalistic novel Kenk: A Graphic Portrait about notorious Toronto bike thief Igor Kent. He is the co-director of Influence documentary about corruption in South Africa.

== Early life and education ==
Poplak was born in Johannesburg. He studied fine art and film making at Concordia University. Poplak is Jewish.

== Career ==
Poplak is the author of the 2011 journalistic comic book Kenk: A Graphic Portrait.

He is a senior contributor to the Daily Maverick.

=== Selected works ===
- Richard Poplak and Diana Neille, Influence, 2020 film
- Richard Poplak and Kevin Bloom, Continental Shift: A Journey into Africa's Changing Fortunes, 2016 Portobello Books, ISBN 978-1-84627-374-2
- Richard Poplak, Ja No Man: Growing Up White in Apartheid Era South Africa, 2007, Penguin Canada ISBN 0-14-305044-3
- Richard Poplak, Kenk: A Graphic Portrait, 2010, Pop Sandbox, ISBN 978-0-9864884-0-5

== Awards ==
Poplak's book Ja No Man made the 2008 Alan Paton Non-Fiction prize long list and the Now Top 10 books of 2007.
