= Rachel Oldroyd =

- Occupation(s): investigative journalist, editor

Rachel Oldroyd was until 2022 the managing editor at the Bureau of Investigative Journalism. She previously worked at The Mail on Sunday, where she launched the Reportage section.

In 2011, she was awarded an Amnesty International UK Media Award for her work on the Iraq war logs.
