= UI Energy Corporation =

Company in Korea

UI Energy Corporation (유아이에너지) is a Korean company founded in 1987 (formerly known as Gong Young Multi System (공영종합시스템)). Its areas of interest include the development of resources and minerals, power plants and the supply of medical equipment. It is quoted on the KOSDAQ (Korea Securities Dealers Automated Quotations).

Its Executive Vice-Chairman is Choi Kyu-sun.

It is part of an international consortium for the development of prospects in Iraqi Kurdistan. It claims that its network of advisors gives it a strong competitive edge over other companies. Paid advisers include:

- Congressman Stephen J. Solarz
- former Secretary of Defense USA Mr. Frank Carlucci
- the former ambassador to Egypt Mr. Nicholas A. Veliotes
- US commander for the Middle East General John Abizaid (General John Abizaid served on the board of advisors from August – October 2007, resigning in November 2007 due to a conflict of interest. All fees were returned.)

These are claimed on the company's website to exercise "their network and political influence to promote UI energy on the development of oil fields in Iraq where the United States of America governs".

It also notes that attorney Jeffrey D. Jones, the former President of the American Chamber of Commerce in Korea, and Dr. Robert A. Scalapino, who served as the Dean of the University of California, Berkeley, are on their company board of advisors.

Its payment of an undisclosed sum to former United Kingdom Prime Minister Tony Blair has been subject to media comment in the UK.

== Kurdistan Contract ==
UI Energy Corporation was part of a consortium (KNOC Bazian Limited) that was awarded the Bazian Block (473 square kilometres) in the Sulaimani Governorate. The consurmtium also includes the Korea National Oil Corporation, and Korean private sector oil exploration and development companies SK Energy Co Ltd, Daesung Industrial Co, Ltd, Samchully Co Ltd, Bum-Ah Resource Development Corp, GS Holdings Corp, and Majuko Corporation. The Bazian Block has been described as a relatively low exploration risk area.
