= SPEAK network =

Christian organization

SPEAK is a Christian network which connects people to campaign and pray on issues of global justice. Through bringing change to situations of injustice SPEAK aims to share their faith in God. The organisation's name comes from Proverbs 31:8-9: "Speak up for those who cannot speak for themselves".

SPEAK combines campaigning and prayer because they believe that they make a powerful combination to bring social transformation. SPEAK believes in networking because they believe that only when acting and praying in unity can people really make a difference.

SPEAK connects both individuals and groups. SPEAK groups typically meet in universities and colleges. Local groups are the main network participants, and there are now over thirty groups in the UK plus others in the United States, France, Spain, various parts of Africa and whole other networks affiliated to SPEAK in Brazil, the Netherlands and Sweden.

In the local group context SPEAK aims to combine faith and action. SPEAK seeks to share their faith in God, as well as campaign for change in where they believe that currently there is injustice, such as world trade and third world debt. SPEAK wants to be a movement that follows Jesus, as he is revealed in the Bible, in a radical way in personal discipleship, as well as striving for social transformation.

As a Christian group, SPEAK aims to base its action on the Bible. Biblical passages such as Proverbs chapter 31 verses 8-9, and Micah chapter 6 verse 8 help to define the purpose of the SPEAK network.

The SPEAK network organises an annual weekend conference known as Soundcheck, which is usually held in London during February. The SPEAK Network also organises regional forums. These events are opportunities for people in local SPEAK groups to meet up with other people involved in the SPEAK Network.
