= Chime Communications Limited =

Marketing services company based in London

- Formerly: Glarmead plc (January–June 1986); The Carpet Tile Company plc (1986–1989); The Chartwell Group plc (1989–1994); Chime Communications plc (1994–2015)
- Type: Private
- Industry: Marketing services
- Founded: 1989; 37 years ago
- Headquarters: London, England
- Key people: Adrian Coleman and Matthew Vandrau (co-chief executives)
- Number of employees: 2500
- Subsidiaries: VCCP Group; VCCP Business
- Website: chimegroup.com

Chime Communications Limited, also known as Chime Group, is a British marketing services company headquartered in Westminster, London, England. Chime is the holding company for companies which include sports marketing, public relations, advertising, digital, marketing, research, corporate responsibility and healthcare communications.

== Operations ==
The group comprises the VCCP Group in marketing communications and VCCP Business for communications in specialist marketplaces.

== History ==
Chime was founded as a private company in 1989 following a management buyout from Lowe Howard Spink and Bell to form Lowe Bell Communications and subsequently floated in 1994 as Chime Communications plc before going private again in late 2015. Chime comprises five divisions, 54 companies and over 2,000 people. Until July 2012 the now defunct PR firm, Bell Pottinger, was wholly owned by Chime Communications.

Chime was de-listed from the London Stock Exchange on 16 October 2015 and re-registered as a private company following a takeover by Providence Equity Partners (81.1%) and WPP plc (18.9%). Chime was re-registered as a limited company on 19 October 2015.

== Executive management ==
The company is governed by an executive management team, consisting of Adrian Coleman and Matthew Vandrau (co-chief executives), Jo Parker (chief operating officer), Stephanie Brimacombe (managing director) and David Crowther (chief financial officer).

Notable former directors include Lord Davies of Abersoch (who left the board following Chime's takeover in October 2015), Lord Hannay of Chiswick and Dame Sue Tinson (who both left the board on 31 December 2006), and Lord Bell (who left the board in June 2012 following a MBO by Bell Pottinger's management team).

=== Good Relations group ===
The Good Relations Group, owned by Chime Communications Limited, has 215 staff, 172 based in the UK. The CEO is Jack Brock-Doyle. As well as Good Relations, the group also includes agencies Harvard, MMK and Ptarmigan; some regional offices of Bell Pottinger Group were also rebranded as Good Relations following Bell Pottinger's MBO in June 2012.

=== Clients ===
Group clients include Sky, Sony, Vodafone, Unilever and EADS. Until July 2012, it also managed PR for Nintendo.

Prior to the MBO split, notable Bell Pottinger clients won by Good Relations included:

- BPEX. In September 2007 Good Relations was briefed by BPEX, previously the Meat and Livestock Commission, to run a campaign to raise consumer awareness of the issue. The objective was to show that messages about the plight of pig farmers were reaching consumers in order to persuade supermarkets to increase the price paid to farmers. They came up with a 'Pigs are worth it' campaign.
- PowerPerfector: an energy-consumption reduction technology company appointed Good Relations in September 2009, ahead of the UK government's 2010 push on carbon reduction.
- Almac Group: a provider of integrated drug development to the biotechnology and pharmaceutical industries, appointed Good Relations in March 2010.
