= The Bureau of Investigative Journalism =

British nonprofit news organisation

Bureau of Investigative Journalism
- Founded: April 2010; 16 years ago
- Type: Nonprofit
- Purpose: Investigative journalism
- Location: London, UK
- Key people: Franz Wild, CEO/Editor in Chief;
- Website: www.thebureauinvestigates.com

The Bureau of Investigative Journalism, typically abbreviated to TBIJ or "the Bureau", is a nonprofit news organisation based in London that was founded in 2010 to pursue "public interest" investigations. The Bureau works with publishers and broadcasters to maximise the impact of its investigations. Since its founding, it has collaborated with Panorama, Newsnight, and File on 4 at the BBC, Channel 4 News and Dispatches, as well as the Financial Times, The Daily Telegraph, and The Sunday Times, among others.

The Bureau has covered a wide range of stories and won many awards including for its coverage of the drone wars and investigation of "joint enterprise" murder convictions. Rozina Breen was the chief executive officer and editor-in-chief from 2022 to 2025. The current chief executive officer and editor-in-chief is Franz Wild.

== History ==
The Bureau was established in 2010 by former Sunday Times reporter Elaine Potter, who worked on exposing the Thalidomide scandal, and her husband David Potter, who founded software company Psion. Initial funding for the project came from the Potters' charitable foundation, which committed £2 million. Elaine cites one of her inspirations being the creation two years previous of ProPublica, a nonprofit organisation based in New York with a similar remit, also funded philanthropically.

In the run-up to launch, Stephen Grey was acting editor until the appointment of Iain Overton as its first permanent managing editor.

Ian Overton was succeeded by former Sunday Times Insight editor Christopher Hird in December 2012 and Rachel Oldroyd became Managing Editor in 2014. Rozina Breen became CEO/Editor in Chief from 2022 until 2025 when Franz Wild was promoted to lead the Bureau.

== Notable investigations ==
=== US raid on Yakla, Yemen ===
On 29 January 2017, a United States-led Special Operations Forces operation was carried out in Yakla Village, Qifah District, in the Al Bayda province in central Yemen. It was the first raid authorized by President Donald Trump, The US military initially denied there were any civilian casualties, but later declared it was investigating if they occurred. An investigation by the Bureau on the ground found that nine children under the age of 13 were killed, with the youngest victim a three-month-old baby. Beside the nine children killed, one pregnant woman was also killed. The Bureau's story was picked up by The Guardian, Newsweek and many other media outlets.

=== Bell Pottinger operations in Iraq ===
The Bureau working with the Sunday Times revealed on 2 October 2016 that the Pentagon paid British PR firm Bell Pottinger $540 million to create fake terrorist videos, fake news articles for Arab news channels and propaganda videos.

An investigation by Abigail Fielding-Smith and Crofton Black revealed the details of the multimillion-pound operation. Bell Pottinger was paid by the US Department of Defence (DoD) for five contracts from May 2007 to December 2011, according to The Times and the Bureau. Lord Bell confirmed that Bell Pottinger reported to the Pentagon, the CIA and the U.S. National Security Council on its work in Iraq.

=== Deaths from antibiotic resistance ===
The Bureau is running a continuing investigation into the threat posed by antibiotic resistant bacteria. In December 2016, Madlen Davies working with the Sunday Telegraph revealed that superbugs were killing at least twice as many people as the government estimated. In October 2016, Andrew Wasley working with The Guardian revealed that pork contaminated with MRSA was being sold at Asda and Sainsbury's.

=== Covert drone war ===
The Bureau monitors drone strike casualties in Pakistan, Yemen and Somalia. In Yemen and Somalia, these figures also include victims of drone strikes, airstrikes, missile attacks and ground operations. Unlike other organisations that track such deaths, the Bureau focuses on identifying non-militant deaths, including children. The data from this research is published online. Jack Serle was one of three Bureau reporters who won the Martha Gellhorn Prize for Journalism in 2013 for "their research into Barack Obama's drone wars and their consequences for civilians".

=== Binary options ===
A series of articles in 2016 written by Melanie Newman exposed the "real wolves of Wall Street" involved in binary options fraud. According to the National Fraud Intelligence Bureau's head of crime, Detective Chief Inspector Andy Fyfe, this is the biggest fraud being perpetrated against British targets today with police receiving an average of two reports of binary trading fraud a day, with the average investor losing £16,000. Fyfe described this as "just the tip of the iceberg" because most of the frauds are not reported to the police because the fraudsters are usually located abroad.

=== Joint enterprise ===
In February 2016, the UK Supreme Court ruled that the law on "joint enterprise" in murder cases, which allows for several people to be charged with the same offence even though they may have played very different roles in the crime, had been wrongly interpreted. This followed a long-running Bureau investigation into joint enterprise. The Bureau found that black British men were more than three times as likely to be serving life sentences as a result of a joint enterprise conviction than those in the prison population overall. Three Bureau reporters – Maeve McClenaghan, Melanie McFadyean and Rachel Stevenson – won the 2013–14 Bar Council Legal Reporting Award for the coverage.

=== Europe's missing millions ===
An investigation in collaboration with the Financial Times into how the European Union structural funds were used, and whether the policy was achieving what it set out to do. It found that millions of euros were being siphoned off by organised crime syndicates, and that money was being used to support multinational corporations instead of small and medium-sized businesses, including help to finance a British American Tobacco cigarette factory. The Bureau co-produced an episode of File on 4 with the BBC on the story that received the UACES Reporting Europe Prize.

=== Lobbying's hidden influence ===
Public relations firm Bell Pottinger were the centre of a Bureau covert filming operation published in The Independent. In the footage senior executives claim that they can get UK prime minister David Cameron to speak to the Chinese premier on behalf of one of their clients within 24 hours, and that they have a team which "sorts" negative Wikipedia coverage.

Bell Pottinger subsequently filed a complaint with the Press Complaints Commission about the investigation, which was rejected.

=== Deaths in police custody ===
An investigation in collaboration with The Independent found that the number of people who had died after being forcibly restrained whilst in police custody was higher than official figures showed. This was due to the exclusion of anyone who had died following restraint but had not at that point been formally arrested. The Bureau also reported their findings with the BBC in an episode of File on 4.

The story won an Amnesty International Media Award.

=== Iraq war logs ===
The Iraq war logs were 391,832 classified United States Army field reports leaked to WikiLeaks, which shared them with a number of news organisations, including the Bureau, before publishing them online in their entirety. The Bureau worked with Al Jazeera and Channel 4 to analyse the documents which detail torture, summary executions, and war crimes carried out by US forces.

The Bureau's reporting received an Amnesty International Media Award.

=== Russia Report ===
In 2019, the Bureau of Investigative Journalism started a crowdfunding exercise to raise funds for legal action to force the British government to release the "Russia Report" detailing the Intelligence and Security Committee's investigation into Russian interference in the 2016 Brexit referendum.

=== Cyprus Confidential ===
In November 2023, the Bureau of Investigative Journalism joined with the International Consortium of Investigative Journalists, Paper Trail Media and 69 media partners including Distributed Denial of Secrets and the Organized Crime and Corruption Reporting Project (OCCRP) and more than 270 journalists in 55 countries and territories to produce the 'Cyprus Confidential' report on the financial network which supports the regime of Vladimir Putin, mostly with connections to Cyprus, and showed Cyprus to have strong links with high-up figures in the Kremlin, some of whom have been sanctioned. Government officials including Cyprus president Nikos Christodoulides and European lawmakers began responding to the investigation's findings in less than 24 hours, calling for reforms and launching probes.

=== Dame Cressida Dick and Palantir ===
On 10 November, 2026, the Bureau reported that Dame Cressida Dick, former Commissioner of the Met Police (2017-2022), had been working for the controversial firm Palantir as a paid adviser.

== Criticism ==
The Bureau was strongly criticised after the Newsnight McAlpine affair in November 2012. BBC Newsnight broadcast an investigation of the North Wales child abuse scandal. The reporter was Angus Stickler who had been seconded to the BBC by the Bureau. Stickler's broadcast report included claims that a prominent, but unnamed, former Conservative politician had sexually abused children during the 1970s. Users of Twitter and other social media immediately identified him as Lord McAlpine. After The Guardian reported that it was mistaken identity, Lord McAlpine issued a strong denial. The accuser unreservedly apologised, admitting that, as soon as he saw a photograph of the individual, he realised he had been mistaken. BBC director-general George Entwistle resigned later that day. The Bureau's Managing Editor Ian Overton and Angus Stickler also resigned.
