= Association of Professional Political Consultants =

- Founded: 1994
- Parent: Public Relations and Communications Association
- Website: www.appc.org.uk

The Association of Professional Political Consultants (APPC) is a United Kingdom organisation, established in 1994, that is the self-regulatory body that represents firms engaged in lobbying activities. APPC membership is open to public affairs firms, in-house PA teams, and individuals. Currently more than 80 member firms and in-house practitioners are listed on the APPC's register.

APPC was established by five firms of lobbyists following the 1994 cash-for-questions affair, a political scandal in the United Kingdom.
