= Public Relations and Communications Association =

UK trade association

- Formerly: Public Relations Consultants Association (1969-2016)
- Type: Public
- Industry: Trade association
- Founded: 1969 (as Public Relations Consultants Association); 2016 (as Public Relations and Communications Association); United Kingdom
- Headquarters: London, United Kingdom
- Number of locations: United Nations; San Francisco, California, United States
- Area served: Worldwide
- Website: www.prca.org.uk

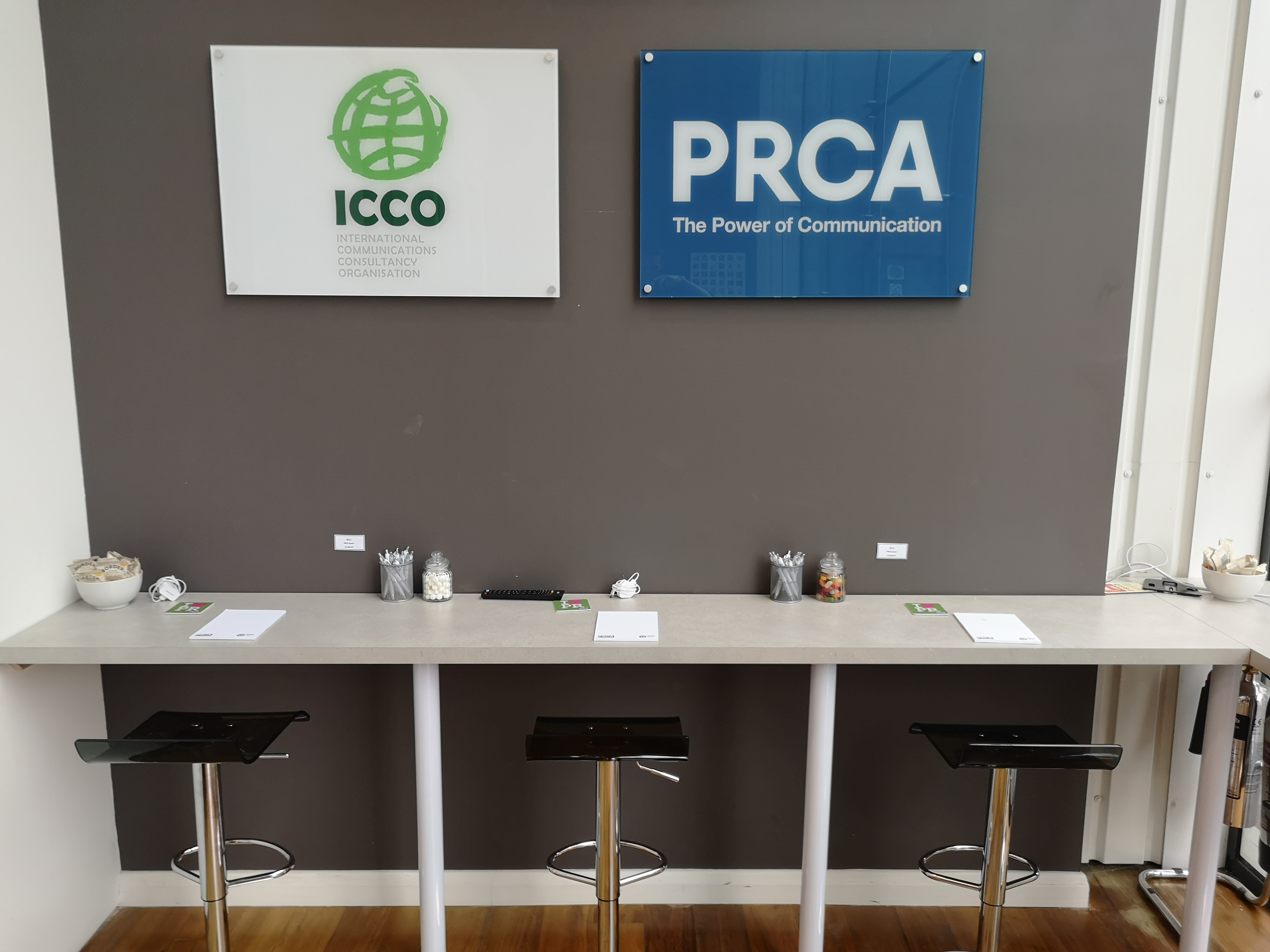
PRCA Office Interior

The Public Relations and Communications Association (PRCA) is a trade association for the public relations sector in the United Kingdom. The association lobbies on behalf of its member companies and also provides a forum for sharing information. It is the largest PR association in Europe, with more than 12,000 members including agencies, in-house communications teams and individual media professionals.

The PRCA aims to raise standards in the PR and communications industry by sharing industry data, information, and best practices, as well as creating networking opportunities.

== History ==
It was founded in 1969 (as the Public Relations Consultants Association), and was originally an organisation for PR agencies; its membership includes 400 agency members, including most of the top 100 UK consultancies; over 100 in-house communications teams from multinationals, UK charities and public sector organisations. The PRCA launched in-house membership in February 2009 and individual membership in October 2011.

In 2001, the PRCA sought a meeting with the Financial Services Authority to develop a code of practice for financial PR consultants.

The PRCA was one of three organisations which founded the UK lobbying self-regulation body, the UK Public Affairs Council, in 2010 - alongside the Association of Professional Political Consultants and the Chartered Institute of Public Relations. However, the PRCA resigned from the UKPAC the following year, in December 2011.

It changed its name to the Public Relations and Communications Association in August 2016.

The PRCA expelled Bell Pottinger in September 2017 after a disciplinary hearing found that a secret campaign by the company to spread racial hatred in South Africa was the worst-ever breach of ethics by a member company. Francis Ingham, the PRCA's director-general, said: "the PRCA has never before passed down such a damning indictment of an agency’s behaviour," and condemning the campaign, which incited racial hatred, as "absolutely unthinkable".

=== Governance review ===
In April 2022, a leading member of the PRCA - John Brown, founder of agency Don’t Cry Wolf - formally raised concerns about Ingham's "increasingly erratic" behaviour, actions and comments, particularly in relation to the 2022 Russian invasion of Ukraine. The complaint was not investigated, and in October 2022 Brown cancelled his agency's membership. Other agencies also raised concerns about the PRCA's governance, and a "comprehensive governance review" by an independent panel was instigated. The panel's membership was announced in November 2022 with the review scheduled to be completed by March 2023. The Financial Times reported agencies' concerns about Ingham's "weird chest beating" rhetoric on Russia, which was said to have put PR professionals in danger of Russian retribution - in September 2022, Russia's Ministry of Foreign Affairs announced that it had placed 30 people, including Ingham and another PR professional, on its black list, banning them from visiting Russia. Ingham believed he might have to resign as director-general, but intended to pursue legal action against the PRCA's board if he was forced out. However, on 16 March 2023, the PRCA announced that Ingham, aged 47, had died after a short illness.

== Arms ==
Coat of arms of Public Relations and Communications Association
Notes Granted in 1976. Crest An ibis crouching Proper. Escutcheon Per pale Sable and Or a chevron composed of annulets interlaced and counterchanged.

== See also ==
- Bob Leaf - founder
