= Igor Kenk =

- Born: 7 April 1959 (age 67); Maribor, PR Slovenia, FPR Yugoslavia
- Status: released (early March 2010)
- Convictions: 16 charges theft (15 December 2009)
- Criminal charges: 58 charges theft
- Penalty: 30 months in jail

Igor Kenk (born 7 April 1959) is known since 2008 as the most infamous and prolific bicycle thief in Canada. More than 3,000 bicycles were recovered in police raids. Kenk pleaded guilty to sixteen Criminal Code charges of theft on 15 December 2009 at Old City Hall court. He was dubbed "the world's most prolific bike thief".

Kenk was born in Slovenia, moved to Canada as an adult and after release from jail, moved to Switzerland.

In 2010, he was the subject of the graphic novel Kenk: A Graphic Portrait.

== Life in Slovenia ==
Igor Kenk was born on 7 April 1959 in Maribor, Slovenia. In Slovenia, he worked as a police officer.

== Life in Canada ==
In February 1988, Kenk moved to Toronto. Kenk was long known for operating The Bicycle Clinic, a bike repair shop on Queen Street West, Toronto, Ontario. In May 1993, Kenk was charged with the Criminal Code offence of possession of stolen property. The Toronto Police Service confiscated 140 bikes but the charges were later dismissed.

The Toronto Police Service (14th Division) raided The Bicycle Clinic on 16 July 2008. However, the Toronto Fire Department prevented the police from entering the building for safety reasons. A Fire Department rescue squad had to remove the upper-floor windows and lower the bicycles by rope because the Queen West store was crammed with bicycles and bike parts. A police sting uncovered 2,865 bikes in garages and warehouses throughout the city. The 50-year-old repair man was hit with 58 charges relating to bike theft and 22 charges relating to drugs. His warehouses was emptied, and about 450 bikes were returned to their owners.

Judge Kathleen Caldwell sentenced Kenk to 30 months in jail. He was released in early March 2010, after serving sixteen months in the Don Jail in Toronto and the Central North Correctional Center in Penetanguishene provincial jail.

=== 2010 book ===
Kenk is the subject of journalistic comic book called Kenk: A Graphic Portrait, which was released in May 2010. In 2012, it was also published in Slovenia.

== Life in Switzerland ==
As of 2019, Kenk lived in Zurich, Switzerland.
