= Kathleen Kelly =

Kathleen Kelly may refer to:

- Kathleen Kelly (conductor), American conductor, coach, and pianist
- Kathleen Kelly (biologist), American biologist
- Kathleen Kelly (actress) (1912–?), British stage and film actress
- Kathleen S. Kelly, American public relations theorist and academic administrator
- Katie Kelly (born 1987), American-Canadian soccer player and manager
- Katie Kelly (paratriathlete) (born 1975), Australian paratriathlete
