= Daniel Edelman =

Daniel Edelman may refer to:

- Daniel Edelman (businessman) (1920–2013), American public relations executive
- Daniel Edelman (soccer) (born 2003), American soccer player
