= Beth McRae =

Beth McRae is a community leader and PR expert with decades of experience

Beth McRae is an American public relations executive and community leader, based in Paradise Valley, Arizona. She is the founder and president of The McRae Agency, a marketing and public relations firm founded in 1995.

== Background ==
McRae was raised in Paradise Valley, the daughter of philanthropic leaders active in the city's early development. She attended Texas Christian University, where she earned a Bachelor of Science in Journalism and a Bachelor of Arts in Marketing. She later earned a Master of Business Administration (MBA) from the University of Phoenix.

=== Career ===
After beginning her career at agencies in Phoenix and San Diego—including the global firm McCann Worldgroup—McRae founded The McRae Agency in 1995. Under her leadership, the agency has represented major local, regional, national and international brands such as Google, Red Bull, Solatube International, The Phoenix Symphony, Petco, Grand Canyon University and Tiffany & Co. McRae has personally received more than 45 industry awards, including the Bank of America Enterprise Award.

In 2025, the agency celebrated its 30th year of operation. It has been consistently ranked as one of the top PR firms in the Southwest, being named "Scottsdale’s Favorite PR Firm" in 2024 and frequently appearing on AZ Big Media’s "Top 10 Public Relations Firms" list.

In 1993, while working in California, she founded the Edward L. Bernays Awards for the San Diego Chapter of the Public Relations Society of America (PRSA), an annual program that remains the chapter's highest honor for PR excellence.

=== Philanthropy and Community Leadership ===
McRae is a prominent figure in the Phoenix philanthropic community and has chaired many of the region's largest charitable galas, including the Phoenix Symphony Ball, Moondance at the Heard and TGen's Runway for Research.

Key Leadership Roles & Honors:

- Charity Founder: Founder of Las Palomas, a women’s group that has raised over $1 million for women’s and children’s charities.
- Board Service: Serves or has served on boards for the Arizona Humane Society, American Heart Association, American Cancer Society, Barry and Peggy Goldwater Foundation and the FBI Phoenix Citizens Academy. She has also chaired the 50th Anniversary of the Phoenix Heart Ball.
- Arts & Culture: Chair of the Phoenix Art Museum’s Circles Advisory Council.
- Public Service: Previously appointed to the Governor’s Commission to Prevent Violence Against Women.

She's also received several awards.

Awards and Recognition:

- Trendsetter (2011): Named by Trends Magazine for lifetime achievement in civic and charitable contributions.
- Community Megastar Award: Awarded for excellence in community service.
- Childsplay "It Takes A Village" Award: Recognized for her commitment to youth and community.
- Leadership Programs: Graduate of Valley Leadership, LEAD San Diego and a member of the Junior League Foundation board. She has also been selected for Scottsdale Leadership Class 40.
