= Public Relations Journal =

Open-access quarterly journal

- Language: English

Publication details
- History: 1945–present
- Publisher: Institute for Public Relations; Public Relations Society of America
- ISO 4: Find out here

Indexing
- ISSN: 1942-4604

Links
- Journal homepage

The Public Relations Journal is an open-access peer-reviewed, electronic academic journal covering topics having to do with public relations and communication studies. It is published quarterly by the Institute for Public Relations and the Public Relations Society of America. The editor-in-chief is Hilary Fussell Sisco (Quinnipiac University).

== History ==
The Public Relations Journal was established in 1945 by Rex F. Harlow (American Council on Public Relations). After this council and the National Association of Public Relations Counsel merged to form the Public Relations Society of America in 1947, it became a monthly publication of the latter society. It was published until 1994, after which it was superseded by two publications, the monthly PR Tactics and the quarterly The Strategist. However, the original Public Relations Journal had an editorial focus towards news, trends, and how-to information about the practice of public relations. The new journal is dedicated to the online publishing of research articles that examine public relations in depth and/or create, test, or expand public relations theory.
