= Accreditation in Public Relations =

The Accreditation in Public Relations (APR), the Accreditation in Public Relations and Military Communications (APR+M), and the Certificate in Principles of Public Relations are voluntary certifications in the United States and Canada for persons working in the field of public relations (PR) and, in the case of the APR+M, military public affairs.

Approximately five percent of public relations practitioners in the U.S. and Canada hold one of the credentials. They are administered by the Universal Accreditation Board, an association of nine major public relations organizations.

== Overview ==
=== History ===
The APR credential was established in 1964 as a certification program sponsored by the Public Relations Society of America (PRSA). The PRSA continued to manage the program until 1998 when the Universal Accreditation Board - consisting of approximately 25 representatives from nine major PR professional societies — was formed as part of an effort to make the credential an industry-wide, instead of organization-specific, certification.

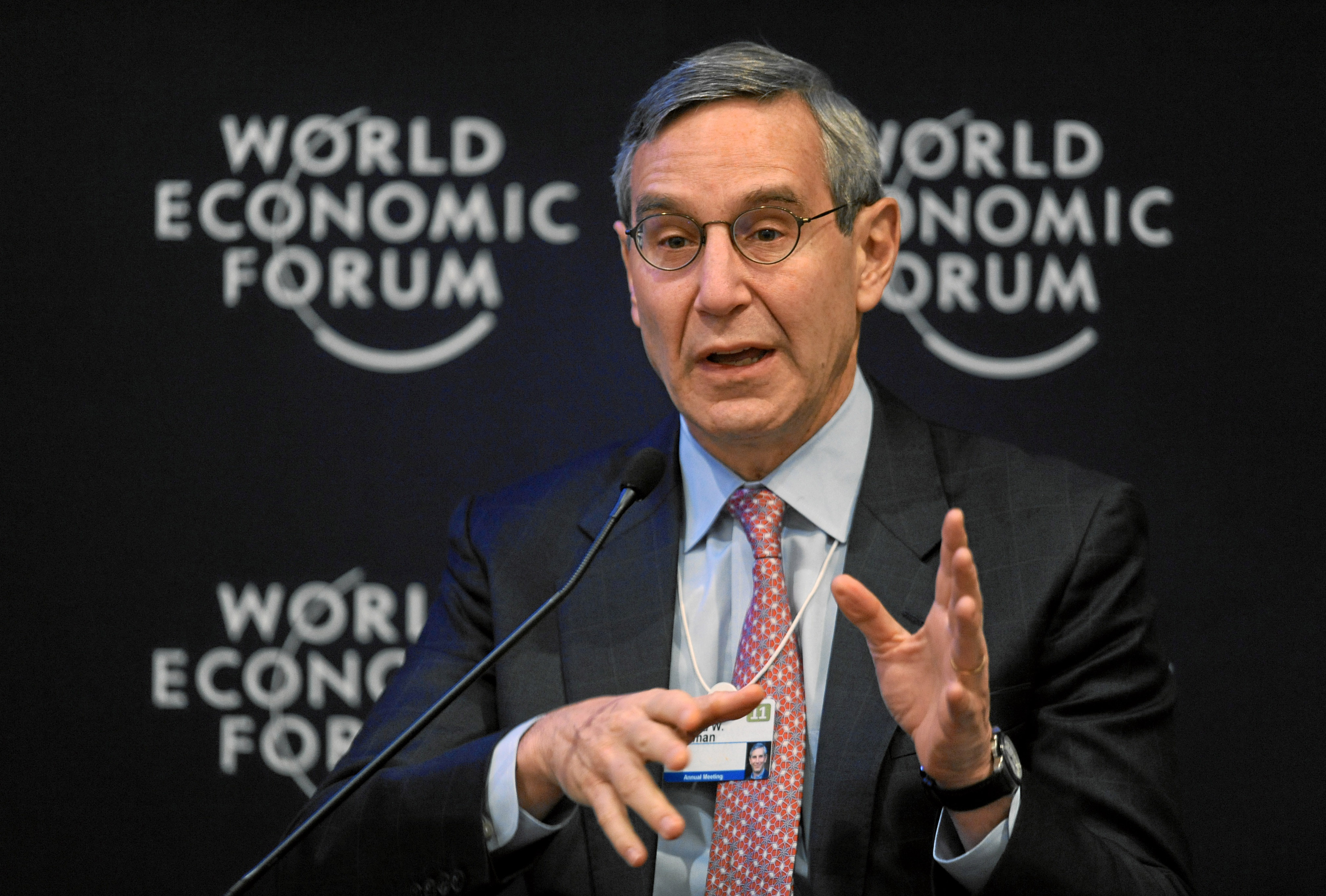
Richard Edelman is among those who called for PRSA to eliminate the APR as a requirement to hold national office in the organization.

=== Support and criticism ===
The APR certification has been endorsed by some in the PR industry who feel it establishes a clear indicator of competence for those who possess it, separating "the contenders from the pretenders." A 2005 survey found that accredited PR practitioners earn, on average, 20-percent more than those who lack accreditation.

A 2003 textbook cites a survey of unaccredited PRSA members which found that 80-percent felt a sense of disenfranchisement from the organization as a result of preferences within the group given to those holding the APR. It also referenced feedback that the certification has been criticized over the low number of APR candidates who are able to successfully complete the requirements to earn the credential. In 2019, 19 percent of all PRSA members are APR certified.

== Credentials ==
=== APR and APR+M credential ===
The Accredited in Public Relations (APR) certification is designed for public relations professionals with five or more years of industry experience, and who possess an undergraduate university degree or higher. To earn the APR, candidates first must be members in good standing of a UAB member organization and submit an application with APR fee. Once the application is approved, the candidate completes a written series of questions detailing their professional background and experience. The candidate is then interviewed by a panel of three current PR practitioners who hold the APR, during which time a portfolio of the candidate's past work is presented and reviewed. The final element is a computer-based examination covering key concepts in PR planning, relationship management, communications theory, legal issues, and professional ethics. Once granted, the certification is retained for life, contingent on completion of regular continuing education activities, and current membership in a UAB member organization.

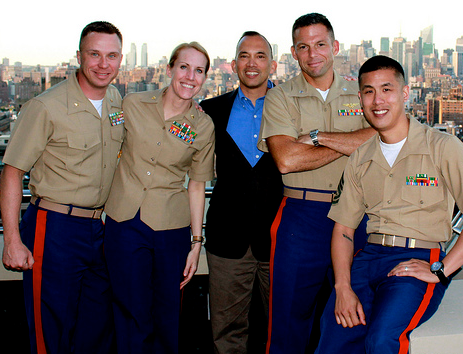
U.S. Marines at the PRSA 2010 "Digital Impact" conference in New York City. Since 2010, the UAB has offered the APR+M certification.

The Accredited in Public Relations and Military Communications (APR+M) credential is designed for members of the United States armed forces and civilian employees of the United States Department of Defense. Unlike the APR, membership in a UAB member organization is not a prerequisite to earn or maintain the APR+M, however, ongoing continuing education is required to maintain the currency of the certification.

=== Certificate in Principles of Public Relations ===
Beginning in 2013, a certification called the "Certificate in Principles of Public Relations" has been offered by the UAB as an entry-level credential for those entering the PR field. The certificate is designed for university students within six months of graduating (before or after) in a degree-granting program in public relations. Candidates must have student-class membership in a UAB member organization, take a university-sponsored or online preparatory course, and pass a computer-based Examination on principles and theory of public relations.

== Universal Accreditation Board ==
The Universal Accreditation Board, which administers the APR, APR+M, and Certificate in Principles of Public Relations, is composed of approximately 25 public relations educators and practitioners appointed by the nine major public relations professional associations including the Public Relations Society of America, the National Association of Government Communicators, the Asociación de Relacionistas Profesionales de Puerto Rico, the Florida Public Relations Association, and the Religion Communicators Council.

2024 Universal Accreditation Board Members
Name	PR Organization	Position
Kristie Aylett, APR	PRSA	UAB Chair
Joy Carter, APR	PRSA	UAB Immediate Past Chair
Yolanda Stephen, APR	PRSA	UAB Vice Chair
Sharee Broussard, Ph.D., APR	PRSA	
Kenneth T. Hagihara, APR	PRSA	
LCDR Kara Lynn Handley, APR+M	PRSA	
Denise M. Hill, Ph.D., APR	PRSA	
Olga Mayoral-Wilson, APR	PRSA	
Marlene S. Neill, Ph.D., APR	PRSA	
Ana Toro, APR	PRSA	
Carlos M. Rivera-Cuesta, APR	ARPR	
Christine Brainerd, APR	CAPIO	
Laura Byrnes, APR, CPRC	FPRA	
Chris M. Gent, APR, CPRC	FPRA	
Nancy J. Roberts, APR	MPRC	
Ann P. Knabe, APR+M	NAGC	
Rebecca Villarreal, APR	NSPRA	
Terry Ryan, APR	NSPRA	
Ginny Hizer, APR	RCC	
Kristie Aylett, APR	SPRF	
Marian R. Faulk, APR	SPRF	
CDR Beth A. Teach, APR+M	DoD Designated Liaison	

== See also ==
- Fellow of the PRSA
