= Fellow of the Public Relations Society of America =

Award granted by the Public Relations Society of America

Fellow of the PRSA
- Sponsored by: Public Relations Society of America
- Country: United States

A Fellow of the PRSA, or Fellow of the Public Relations Society of America, is an honorary designation granted to individuals by the Public Relations Society of America (PRSA). Established in 1990, persons named fellows are collectively known as the College of Fellows of the Public Relations Society of America; approximately 350 persons have been so named. Notable fellows include Daniel J. Edelman, James Lukaszewski, Richard Weiner, Betsy Plank, and Louis Capozzi.

According to the Public Relations Society of America, Fellows of the PRSA are annually nominated by a committee composed of current fellows and formally elected by the society's board of directors. They must have 20 years experience in the practice or teaching of public relations, hold the Accreditation in Public Relations, be endorsed by six people, be members of the society, and have demonstrated a history of contributions to the profession of public relations "through service or leadership" as well as "superior professional capability".

== See also ==
- Fellowships
