= Metropolitan State =

Metropolitan state could mean:

- Metropole
- Metropolitan State University in Minnesota
- Metropolitan State University of Denver in Colorado
