= Cecilia Romo =

Mexican actress (1945–2020)

- Born: 5 December 1945; Mexico City, Mexico
- Died: 30 August 2020 (aged 74); Mexico City, Mexico
- Occupation: Actress
- Spouse(s): Raul Domingo González Soto (divorced); Alfonso Ravelo (divorced); Guillermo Coelho (?-2020; her death)
- Children: 4, including Claudia Romo Edelman

Cecilia Romo, also known as Ceci Romo (5 December 1945 – 30 August 2020) was a Mexican film, theatrical, and television actress. Prior to her professional acting career, which began in the 1980s, she was a member of Mexico women's national basketball team during the 1960s. Romo, who appeared in more than 30 theater productions during her career, was often cast as rebellious or comedic characters. Her telenovela and television roles became popular throughout Mexico and Latin America during the 1990s.

== Biography ==
=== Early life and career ===
Romo was born on 5 December 1945, in Mexico City. She was raised in Ciudad Juárez, Chihuahua. Her mother, Cecilia Santillan de Romo, was a high school teacher, while her father, Luis Romo Maconde, owned and operated several pharmacies and medical laboratories.

An athlete, Romo played for Mexico women's national basketball team during the 1960s. She then enrolled at the National Autonomous University of Mexico (UNAM) and received her bachelor's degree in 1978. Romo worked as an economist for the Mexican government before becoming a talent manager for advertising models.

=== Acting career ===
In the early 1980s, Romo received a phone call at her agency looking for extras for the American science fiction film, Dune, which was filming in Mexico at the time. Romo, who was 38-years old at the time, decided to sign up as an extra for film herself. She enjoyed the experience and quickly decided to pursue acting as a career. She was soon cast in the 1985 film, Los Náufragos del Liguria, which focused on a group of shipwreck survivors. Romo soon found on-screen acting roles in Mexican television during the mid and late 1980s as well, launching a decades-long professional TV career.

Romo was taller than most other television actresses, but became popular with audiences in Latin America and Mexico for her comedic facial expressions and gift for slapstick comedy. For example, in the 1990s telenovela De pocas, pocas pulgas, Romo enters a doctor's office, scaring the patient "with a syringe the size of a hunting rifle," according to the New York Times. In the TV Azteca telenovela Prófugas del destino (2010-2011), Romo utilized her trademark comedic facial expressions to play Madre Lourdes, a mother superior who discovers that several of the women in her convent are actually escaped fugitives disguised as nuns.

Romo also appeared in more than 30 professional theatrical plays and musicals, including the Spanish-language, Mexican productions of Hello, Dolly!, La Cage aux Folles, and Mame. In 2003, she appeared in the American film, Out of Time, starring Denzel Washington.

In 2012 interview for the program "Momentos de Telenovela" on Televisa San Luis, Romo discussed the range of characters she had played on stage and screen, which were often rebellious, but also comedic, "I've played all the nuns in the world: mother superior, the kitchen nun, the garden nun. All of them! In comedies, dramas, theater, musicals." Actress Mayra Rojas, who appeared opposite her in several productions, noted that "She [Romo] played a lot of villains, but the roles that she was most known for were playful and cheeky, because she was like that." Romo's villainous roles included a witch and evil nurses and nuns.

Romo was known for a personal and professional sense of humor. On the set of her final television series, Como tú no hay 2 (2020), Romo began whistling like a stereotypical truck driver to catch the attention of the crew and her co-stars. She and the show's writers ultimately incorporated her whistle into her character, Doña Remedios, a traditional healer in a local market.

=== Death ===
Cecilia Romo died from complications of COVID-19 in Mexico City, on 30 August 2020, after a 169-day battle with the illness during the COVID-19 pandemic in Mexico. She had been hospitalized several times during her treatment for COVID-19 and its complications, including anemia and three pulmonary hemorrhages. Romo died just five months after she filmed her final episode of Como tú no hay 2.

Romo was survived by her third husband, film editor Guillermo Coelho; two of her four children, diplomat Claudia Romo Edelman and Luis Roberto Ravelo Romo; and two grandchildren. Her two other children, Adriana González Romo and Raúl González Romo, both died from genetic disorders as toddlers. Romo's previous marriages, to civil engineer Raul Domingo González Soto and musician Alfonso Ravelo, ended in divorce.

== Filmography ==
=== Telenovelas ===
- Rosa salvaje (1987–1988)
- La casa al final de la calle (1989) – Verónica
- Lo blanco y lo negro (1989) – Cristina Carvajal
- Cadenas de amargura (1991) – Madre Superiora
- Valentina (1993) – Madre Eugenia
- Si Dios me quita la vida (1995)
- El premio mayor (1995–1996)
- Tu y yo (1996–1997) – Gudelia
- De pocas, pocas pulgas (2003)
- Marina (2006) – Madre Superiora
- Yo amo a Juan Querendón (2007)
- Amor sin maquillaje (2007)
- Juro que te amo (2008) – Olvido
- Mañana es para siempre (2008–2009) – Enfermera
- Prófugas del destino (2010) – Madre Lourdes
- Vivir a destiempo (2013) – Úrsula
- Como tú no hay 2 (2020) – Doña Remedios

=== Other television series ===
- La hora marcada (1988)
- La telaraña (1990)
- Papá soltero (1993)
- Que chavas (1994)
- Aquí está la Chilindrina (1994) – Sor Gertrudis
- Desde Gayola (2002) – Menopausica
- Mujer, casos de la vida real (1994–2006)
- ¡Que madre tan padre! (2006) – Señora Bueno
- Mujeres asesinas (2009) – Angeles Chata Bovela
- La rosa de Guadalupe (2008–2011) – Beatriz/Amparo/Martha/Felicia
- Como dice el dicho (2016) – Sarita
- Un día cualquiera (2016) – Tisibe
- Silvia Pinal, frente a ti (2019)

=== Films ===
- Los náufragos del Liguria (1985)
- El segundo aire (2001)
- Out of Time (2003)
- Fantasías (2003) – Michelle
- Corazón marchito (2007) – Isela
- Rock Marí (2010) – Edna
- Luz azul (2010) (short film)
- Amante de lo ajeno (2012) – Elvira
