= James Lukaszewski =

American author, speaker, and crisis management consultant

James E. Lukaszewski
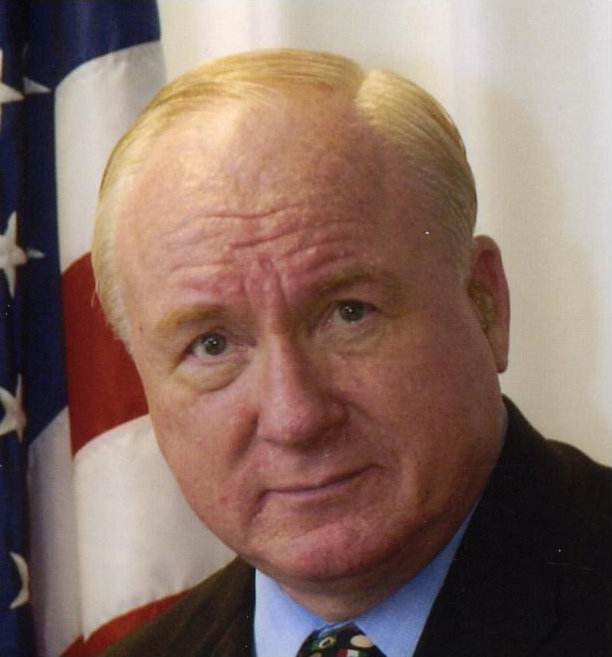
- Born: August 27, 1942 (age 84); Kewaunee, Wisconsin, United States
- Education: Metropolitan State University
- Occupations: Author, crisis management consultant
- Known for: Founder and president of The Lukaszewski Group Division of Risdall Public Relations

James E. Lukaszewski (loo-ka-CHEV-skee) is an American author, speaker, and crisis management consultant who is the president of The Lukaszewski Group Division, Risdall Marketing Group. He is a recipient of the Patrick Jackson Award for Distinguished Service to the Public Relations Society of America and PR News’ Lifetime Achievement Award.

== Early life ==
James E. Lukaszewski was born on August 27, 1942, in Kewaunee, Wisconsin.

In 1960, he graduated from Robbinsdale High School in Minnesota, and enrolled at Macalester College, leaving the school in 1961, and returning in 1962. Later, he pursued a pharmacy degree at the University of Minnesota, before eventually enrolling at the Minnesota Metropolitan State College (MMSC). In 1974, he earned his B.A. degree in political public relations from MMSC. He is currently in graduate school at MMSC.

== Career ==
In 1974–1976, Lukaszewski served as an adult intern in the Press Office of former Minnesota Governor Wendell R. Anderson. Following his internship, Lukaszewski became the Director of Publicity and Publications for the Minnesota Department of Economic Development. He later became the agency's Deputy Commissioner in 1976–1978.

In 1978–1983, with his wife, Barbara, Lukaszewski founded the Minnesota-based Media Information Systems Corporation, a public relations firm that specialized in crisis management and media training. He also served as President of the ExecuCom Division of Brum and Anderson Public Relations.

In 1986, he moved to New York City, where he became a partner at Chester Burger Company, the nation's first communications management firm. He also served as senior vice president and director of executive communication programs at Georgeson & Company. He founded The Lukaszewski Group Inc. in 1989, in White Plains, New York.

Lukaszewski became an adjunct associate professor of communications at New York University's School of Continuing and Professional Studies in 1987–2009.

In 2010, he dissolved The Lukaszewski Group Inc. and returned to Minnesota to become the founding president of The Lukaszewski Group division of Risdall McKinney Public Relations.

== Recognition ==
He has been honored by business leaders, companies, colleges, and universities for his work in the field and as a Public Relations Educator, Mr. Lukaszewski received honors from the PRSA, including President's Citation Award in 2000 and every year since, the Donald G. Padilla Distinguished Practitioner Award, a Distinguished Alumni Award in 2013, and the John W. Hill Lifetime Achievement Award in 2010.

He is a member of the Rowan University Public Relations Hall of Fame and the PRSA Lloyd B. Dennis Distinguished Leadership Award.

Trust Across America has conferred its Lifetime Achievement Award and nationally recognized for his leadership on trustworthy business for many years.

He was a Ben Bronstein Lecturer at Pennsylvania State University in 2013 and received the Drew Middleton Award for Distinguished Service in support of the U.S. Marine Corps E. Coast Command.

He is a member of the PRSA's College of Fellows (Fellow PRSA) and the PRSA's Board of Ethics & Professional Standards (BEPS) Emeritus Member.

== Memberships ==
Lukaszewski is a member of the International Association of Business Communicators (IABC), the Public Relations Society of America (PRSA), and ASIS International. He served on ASIS International's Crisis Management and Business Continuity Council (CMBCC) until 2014. Lukaszewski is a member of the PRSA's College of Fellows (Fellow PRSA) and the PRSA's Board of Ethics and Professional Standards (BEPS). He has been a members of BEPS since 1992, and they named him an emeritus member in 2015. He was also selected as an IABC Fellow and began serving on the IAB Communication Certification Council (GCCC) in 2015.

== Authorship ==
Lukaszewski is a member of the Boards of Professionals of The Public Relations Review, a contributing editor to Public Relations Quarterly, a member of the editorial board of Case Studies in Strategic Communication at UNC-Chapel Hill, and a contributing columnist to PR News. He has published 19 monographs on communication subjects since 1994, twelve manuals and books, including Why Should the Boss Listen to You, The Seven Disciplines of The Trusted Strategic Advisor, and Lukaszewski on Crisis Communication: What Your CEO Needs to Know About Reputation Risk and Crisis Management and has written numerous articles. Lukaszewski on Crisis Communication was one of Soundview's Best Business Books of 2013.

=== Bibliography ===
- Executive Television Training Handbook, ExecuCom (1983)
- Having Effective Media Interviews, ExecuCom (1984)
- The Publicity Handbook, ExecuCom (1984)
- The Tactical Ingenuity Pyramid, TLG Publishing, White Plains, New York (1989)
- Executive Action Crisis Management Anthology, TLG Publishing/PRSA, White Plains, New York (1992)
- Influencing Public Attitudes: Direct Communication Strategies that Reduce the Media's Influence on Public Decision-Making, Issue Action Publications, Leesburg, Virginia (1992)
- Executive Action Emergency Media Relations Guide, TLG Publishing, White Plains, New York (1992, 1993)
- Executive Action Crisis Management Workbook, TLG Publishing, White Plains, New York (1992, 1993)
- Contributing Author, Disaster Recovery Testing: Exercising Your Contingency Plan (1994)
- Contributing Author, Crisis Response: Inside Stories on Managing Image Under Siege (1994)
- Contributing Author, "Environmental Health and Safety Auditing Handbook" (1994);
- Corporate Communications Plan Vol. 1, Vol. 2, Vol. 3, TLG Publishing, White Plains, New York (1995)
- Contributing Author, Practical Public Affairs in an Era of Change: A Cutting Edge Guide for Government, Business and College (1995)
- Contributing Editor, Public Relations Quarterly (1997-Present)
- Crisis Communication Planning Strategies, A Workbook, TLG Publishing, White Plains, New York (2000)
- Media Relations Strategies During Emergencies, A Guide, TLG Publishing/PRSA, White Plains, New York (2000)
- War Stories and Crisis Communication Strategies, An Anthology, TLG Publishing/PRSA, White Plains, New York (2000)
- Editor, TRUST Newsletter, TLG Publishing, White Plains, New York (2001-2002);
- Co-author, Executive Action Crisis Communication Plan Components and Models, TLG Publishing, White Plains, New York (2005)
- Co-author, Why Should the Boss Listen to You? The Seven Disciplines of the Trusted Strategic Advisor, Jossey Bass, Wiley Imprint, San Francisco (2008);
- Lukaszewski on Crisis Communication: What Your CEO Needs to Know About Reputation Risk and Crisis Management, Rothstein Books, Brookfield, Connecticut (2013)
- Manager's Guide to Handling the Media in Crisis, Saying and Doing the Right Thing When It Matters Most, Rothstein Books, Brookfield, Connecticut (2014)
- Co-author (with Steve Harrison), The Decency Code: The Leader's Path to Building Integrity and Trust, McGraw Hill Education Books, New York (2020)

=== In print ===
- Why Should the Boss Listen to You? The Seven Disciplines of the Trusted Strategic Advisor, Jossey-Bass
- Lukaszewski on Crisis Communication: What Your CEO Needs to Know About Reputation Risk and Crisis Management, Rothstein & Associates, Inc.
- Co-author (with Steve Harrison), The Decency Code: The Leader's Path to Building Integrity and Trust, McGraw Hill Education Books, New York (2020)
