= David E. Sweet =

American academic

- Born: July 9, 1933; Holyoke, Massachusetts, US
- Died: September 16, 1984 (aged 51); Providence, Rhode Island, US
- Education: A.B., Drury College, 1955; A.M., Duke University, 1958; Ph.D., Duke University, 1968
- Occupations: Academic; College Professor; College President
- Employer(s): Duke University; Ohio University; Illinois State University; Minnesota State College System; Metropolitan State University; Rhode Island College
- Spouse: Arleene Pachl

David Emery Sweet (1933–1984) was an American academic and the founding president of Metropolitan State University and later president of Rhode Island College, where he spearheaded the Leadership Rhode Island program and presided over the college's evolution from a normal college into a multipurpose college.

== Early life and education ==
David Emery Sweet was born on July 9, 1933, in Holyoke, Massachusetts, the son of Adrian John Sweet and Elsie King (née: Jocelyn) Sweet. His family moved to Memphis, Tennessee in his youth, and he graduated from Central High School in 1951. He received his BA degree from Drury College in 1955, graduating magna cum laude; and his MA (1958) and his PhD (1968) from Duke University, where he was an instructor in political science and faculty adviser of the Christian Science Organization on campus.

== Career ==
Sweet was an instructor at Ohio University for the year 1959-1960 and then served as an associate professor of political science at Illinois State University, 1960–1969. From 1969 to 1971 he served as vice chancellor of the Minnesota State College System.

In 1971, he was chosen to become the founding president of Metropolitan State College, an innovative non-traditional institution in St. Paul, Minnesota, which evolved into Metropolitan State University. In 1974, a national panel on higher education in the United States selected Sweet as one of the fifty most effective university and college presidents in the country.

In 1977, Dr. Sweet left Metro State to become president of Rhode Island College, at the time a college for teachers. During its tenure there, he spearheaded the Leadership Rhode Island program and presided over the college's evolution into a multipurpose college granting bachelors as well as master's degrees in many fields. While president, he continued to teach political science, and enrollment in the school grew by almost fifteen percent.

Sweet was published in the fields of political science and education extensively, and received many grants and fellowships for his work.

== Personal life ==
David E. Sweet married Arleene Pachl on June 4, 1954. They had two children. He was a Christian Scientist.

Sweet was active in his community in Rhode Island, and sat on numerous boards and committees.

== Death ==
Sweet died on September 16, 1984, in a Providence, Rhode Island hospital after suffering an apparent diabetic seizure and cardiac arrest, but apparently declining medical treatment there. He was buried with his parents, Elsie and Adrian Sweet, in Spring Grove Cemetery, Florence, Massachusetts. His wife Arleene died in 2017.

== Legacy ==
David E. Sweet has been memorialized in the following ways:

- Leadership Rhode Island established the annual David E. Sweet Award.
- Rhode Island College's David E. Sweet Center for Public Policy is named for him.
- Rhode Island College's dormitory Sweet Hall was named for him.
