= Claudia Romo Edelman =

Mexican diplomat

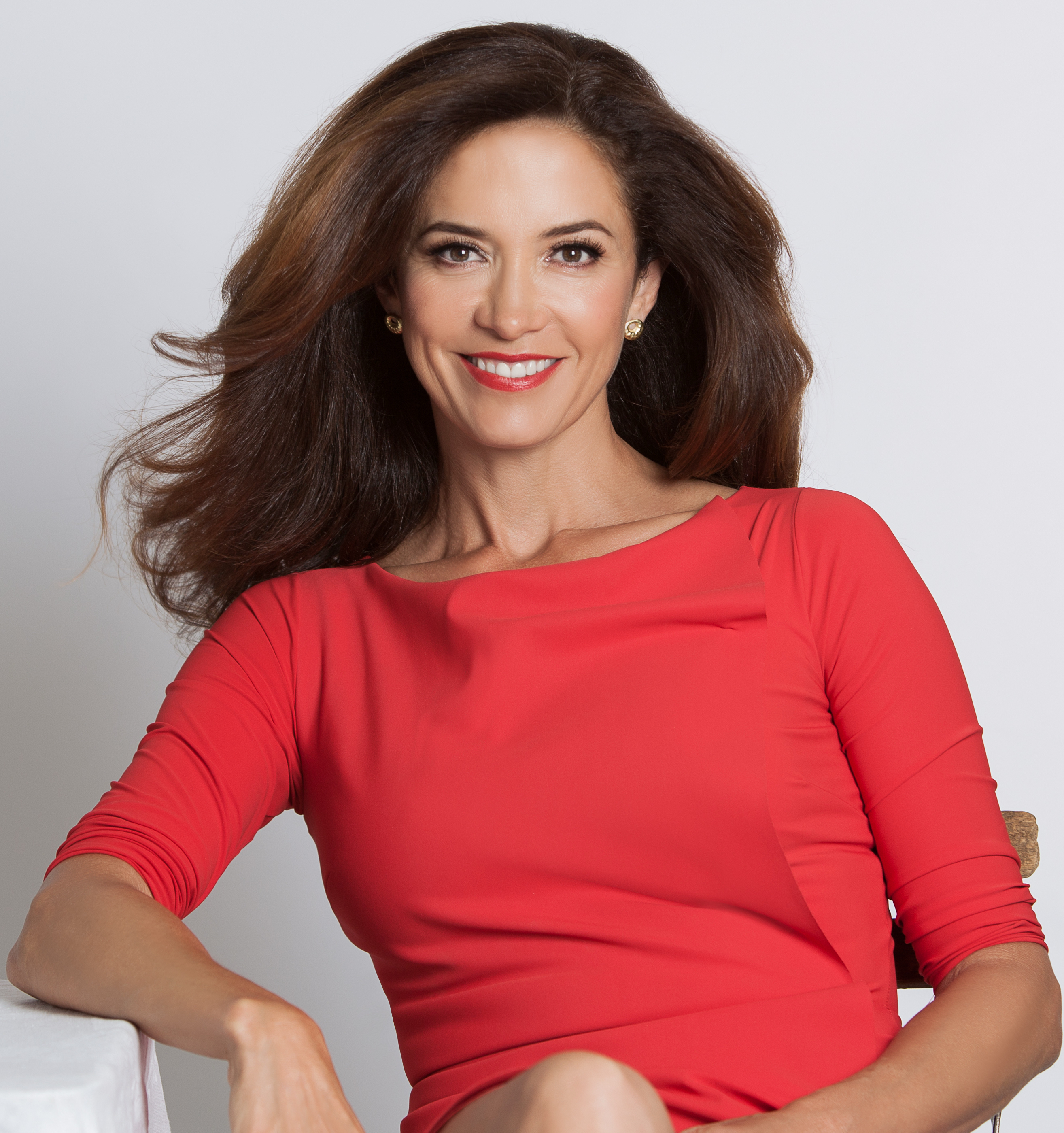
- Born: January 14, 1971 (age 55)
- Education: Universidad Intercontinental; London School of Economics
- Occupations: Activist and Speaker
- Children: 2

Claudia Romo Edelman (née Claudia González Romo) is a social activist and speaker. She was Chief of Communications for the Secretary General of the United Nations and ran global advocacy for UNICEF, as well as worked in public relations and marketing for other international organizations, such as the World Economic Forum, the United Nations Refugee Agency and The Global Fund to fight AIDS, Tuberculosis and Malaria.

== Education ==
Claudia Romo Edelman holds degrees in communications and philosophy from Universidad Intercontinental, in Mexico, as well as a master's in political communications from the London School of Economics.

== Career ==
Claudia has worked as chief of communications in the Executive Office of the Secretary General of the United Nations, working for the special adviser for the 2030 Agenda for Sustainable Development and climate change. In 2014 she also started running global advocacy for UNICEF, and has been a member of the Board of the Bank Street College of Education.

She has worked in public relations and marketing for international organizations such as the World Economic Forum, the United Nations Refugee Agency and The Global Fund to fight AIDS, Tuberculosis and Malaria. Claudia has also been a visiting marketing professor of the University of Geneva.

Romo Edelman has contributed to media platforms including Despierta América (Univision), NBC-Telemundo, AdAge, El Heraldo de México, and Reforma. She founded the Hispanic Star initiative under the We Are All Human Foundation, which focuses on visibility and representation of Hispanic and Latinx communities in the United States. In 2024, she co-launched the podcast A LA LATINA – The Playbook to Succeed Being Your Authentic Self, highlighting the professional experiences of Latina executives.

== Personal life ==
Claudia is the daughter of Mexican actress Cecilia Romo and Raúl Domingo González Soto. She lives in New York City, is married to Richard Edelman and has two children. She also speaks six languages.

== Honors and awards ==
- Latino Leaders Magazine 100 Latinas, 2020, 2025.
- TIME’s Latino Leaders, 2024 List.
- People en Español Poderosas, 25 Most Influential Latinas, 2020, 2025.
- ALPFA’s 50 Most Powerful Latinas, 2019, 2020, 2021, 2022.
- Crain’s Notable Hispanic Leaders and Executives Award, 2021.
- HPRA President’s Award, 2023.
