= J. R. O'Dwyer Company =

American publishing company

J.R. O'Dwyer Company is an online and print news and information publisher covering the public relations and marketing communications fields in New York City, established in 1968.

== O'Dwyer's magazine ==
O'Dwyer's (ISSN 1931-8316) is a monthly magazine that covers marketing communications, new media, public relations and related fields. It is edited by Jon Gingerich. Jack O'Dwyer is the Editor in Chief. It was previously titled O'Dwyer's PR Report.

== Public relations rankings ==
The O'Dwyer company publishes rankings of the PR companies in the United States through annual directories.

According to Jack O'Dwyer, there are 12 categories of rankings. In order to be ranked, PR firms must provide financial documents, such as the top page of their latest income tax return and their W-3 form showing payroll.

== Other publications ==
=== Periodicals ===
- O'Dwyer's PR services report. Monthly, ISSN 1043-2957, OCLC 60615986 and OCLC 19378561
- O'Dwyer's Washington, D.C. public relations directory. Annual, ISSN 1076-6359, 1994 —
- O'Dwyer's PR buyer's guide OCLC 56218135

=== Books ===
- O'Dwyer's media placement guide : how to work with editors and enjoy it. OCLC 52418860.

== Legal dispute ==
O'Dwyer shared partial transcripts of a presentation from PRSA's annual conference in 1993 to criticize the speaker's ethics for promoting the use of advertising spend to influence editorial at major newspapers. The speaker sued O'Dwyer for copyright infringement and the court ruled that O'Dwyer was protected under fair use. Copyright.gov reports "The court granted defendants’ motion to dismiss, finding that defendants’ publication of articles discussing plaintiff's public speech and defendants’ distribution of the transcripts constituted fair use. The court held that defendants’ purposes were to fairly and reasonably review, comment on, and criticize plaintiff's speech."
