= Kathleen S. Kelly =

American public relations theorist and academic administrator

- Other name: Kathleen S. Mehrman
- Occupations: Public relations theorist, academic administrator

Academic background
- Education: University of Maryland, College Park (BS, MA, PhD)
- Thesis: Shifting the Public Relations Paradigm: A Theory of Donor Relations Developed Through a Critical Analysis of Fund Raising and Its Effect on Organizational Autonomy (1989)
- Doctoral advisor: James E. Grunig

Kathleen S. Kelly is an American public relations theorist and academic administrator. She is a professor and chair of the department of public relations at University of Florida. Kelly was the Hubert J. Bourgeois Research Professor in Communication at University of Louisiana at Lafayette. She served as associate dean of the Philip Merrill College of Journalism. Kelly is a Fellow of the PRSA.

== Education ==
Kelly earned a B.S. in journalism/news-editorial from University of Maryland, College Park (UMD) in 1973. In 1979, she completed a M.A. in journalism/public relations at UMD. Kelly earned a Ph.D. in public (mass) communication with a specialization in public relations at the UMD in 1989. Her doctoral advisor was James E. Grunig. Her dissertation on fund raising and public relations became the basis of her first book in 1991.

== Career ==
In 1974, Kelly began her career as a staff writer in a college public information office. She later worked as a public relations practitioner and development officer. She was the director of public information at Bowie State University, vice president of development and public relations at Mount Vernon College for Women.

At University of Maryland, College Park, Kelly served as director of development at and associate dean of the Philip Merrill College of Journalism.

In August 1991, she joined the faculty at University of Louisiana at Lafayette where she was the Hubert J. Bourgeois Research Professor in Communication and coordinator of the public relations program. She later joined the University of Florida as a professor and chair of the department of public relations.

== Awards and honors ==
In 1996, Kelly was elected Fellow of the PRSA.

== Selected works ==
- Kelly, Kathleen S. (1991). Fund Raising and Public Relations: A Critical Analysis. L. Erlbaum Associates. ISBN 978-0-8058-0943-5.
- Kelly, Kathleen S. (1998). Effective Fund-raising Management. Lawrence Erlbaum Associates. ISBN 978-0-8058-1321-0.
