= Canadian Public Relations Society =

Canadian professional society

- Formation: 1948
- Members: 1,700 (2004)
- President: Victor Vrsnik
- Executive-Director: Tyler Callaghan
- Website: cprs.ca

The Canadian Public Relations Society (CPRS) is a professional society for practitioners of public relations in Canada. Established at a meeting in Montreal in 1948, it subsequently amalgamated with the Public Relations Association of Ontario.

In 1961, the CPRS co-sponsored, with the Public Relations Society of America, the Third World Congress in Public Relations, which was held in Montreal.

The CPRS job board connects qualified public relations candidates with employers across all of Canada
