= Florida Public Relations Association =

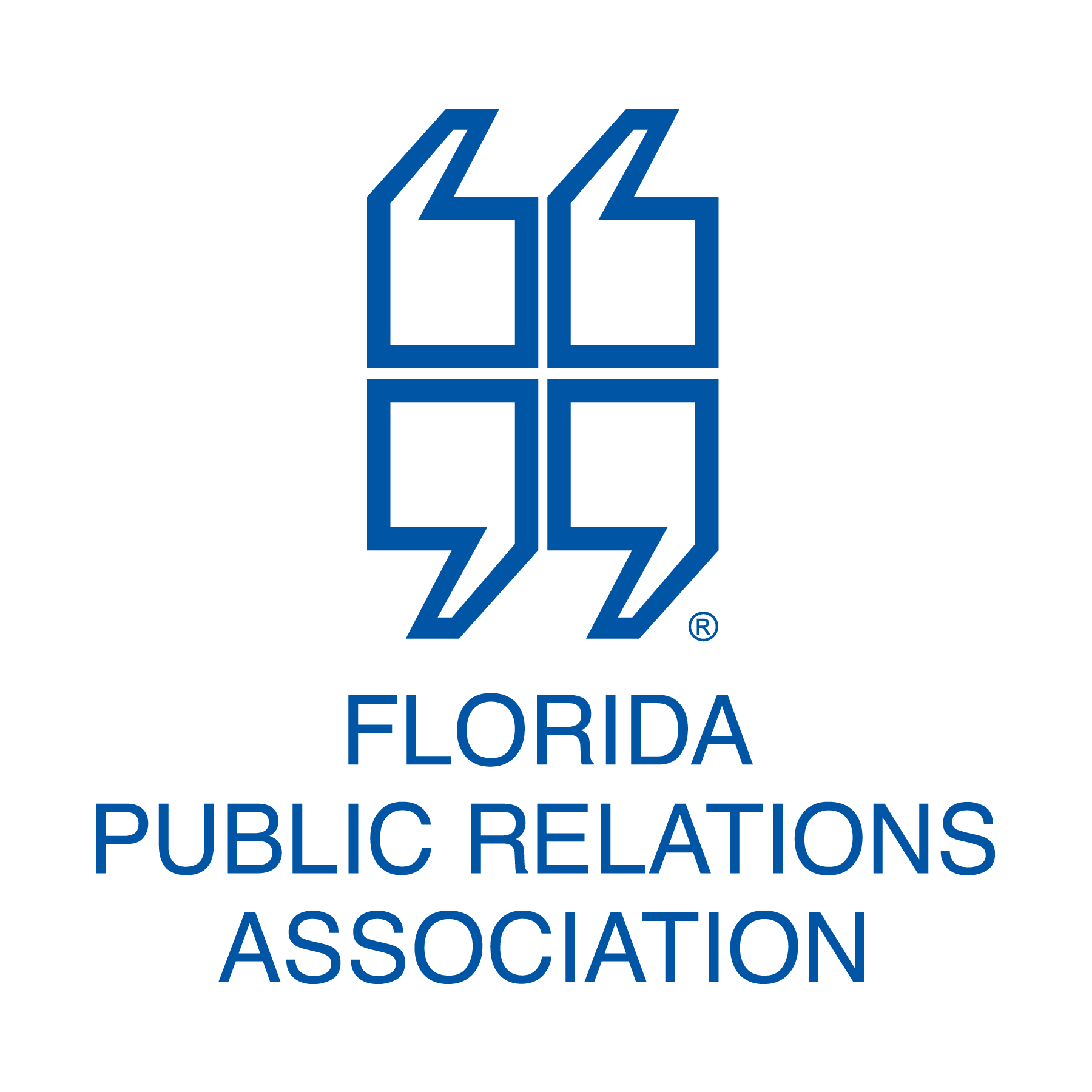
Logo of the Florida Public Relations Association.

Founded in 1938, the Florida Public Relations Association (FPRA) is the oldest public relations association in the United States. The statewide organization is composed of nearly 1,200 public relations professionals dedicated to:

- Enhancing the professional development of its members,
- Providing a forum for personal growth through interaction and resource exchange,
- Serving as the "united voice" of the public relations profession in Florida,
- Fostering the highest professional standards and ethics of its members, and
- Gaining understanding and support for the performance of its members and the profession as a whole on behalf of all practitioners within the state of Florida.

== Professional Chapters ==
With a network of 15 professional chapters and 13 student chapters located throughout the state of Florida, FPRA offers its members many opportunities for professional development and networking. Chapters meet regularly to hear speakers, discuss career experiences and conduct general business.

- Capital Chapter
- Central West Coast Chapter
- Dick Pope/Polk County Chapter
- Gainesville Chapter
- Jacksonville Chapter
- Lake County Chapter
- Northwest Florida Coast Chapter
- Ocala Chapter
- Orlando Area Chapter
- Pensacola Chapter
- Space Coast Chapter
- South Florida Chapter
- Southwest Florida Chapter
- Space Coast Chapter
- Tampa Bay Chapter
- Treasure Coast Chapter
- Volusia/Flagler Chapter

== Student Chapters ==
- Barry University
- Chomp Chapter at University of Florida
- Communique Student Chapter at Rollins College
- FGCU Student Chapter at Florida Gulf Coast University
- First Coast Student Chapter at Jacksonville University
- Florida Tech Student Chapter at Florida Institute of Technology
- Impact Student Chapter at Stetson University
- Pensacola Student Chapter at University of West Florida
- PRoMotion Student Chapter at Florida Southern College
- Quotes Student Chapter at University of Central Florida
- Student Chapter at Southeastern University
- Student Chapter at University of Tampa
- Tallahassee Student Chapter at Florida State University and Florida A&M University
- Vision Student Chapter at Bethune-Cookman College

== History ==
FPRA was founded in 1938 when Chamber of Commerce executives cut the subject out of their program at a statewide meeting in Jacksonville. John W. Dillin, publicity director of the Miami Beach Chamber of Commerce, had made the trip to Jacksonville especially to participate in the program. On his return to South Florida, he stopped at Silver Springs to talk with Wilton Martin. They discussed forming an organization dealing with publicity and public relations. The owners of the attraction agreed to host those who would be interested. Invitations were extended to six others. Two meetings were held before calling an all-Florida meeting in Tampa where 45 attended. The group voted to form the Florida Association of Publicity Directors and elected Dillin to serve as president.

Executive meetings were held throughout the year and in several locations in the state prior to the first annual meeting in St. Augustine where Dillin had moved to take over a chamber of commerce management. The assembly drew representatives of attractions, chambers of commerce, newspaper and radio stations, advertising and display executives. It also was held simultaneously with the Florida Press Association and the Florida Junior Chamber of Commerce. Although Dillin wanted to develop a clinic for learning to do "publicity and public relations" better, it developed into a Florida promotional program.

In the second year, it was voted to change the name to the Florida Publicity and Public Relations Association, but before the meeting was concluded it was back to FAPD. The organization grew steadily until World War II when many members enlisted and were in service until 1946. Although it took time to refresh its activities, the association began to grow again. Finally, the name "publicity" was eliminated and adopted the "public relations" theme. Clinics were held in "learning to do the job" better, which was the objective in the first place.

University of Florida, University of Miami and Stetson University joined the learning program and written examinations were held at the conclusion of each clinic. After four years, Certificates of Attainment were issued. Chapters were formed throughout the state and the association grew to more than 1,000 members. Some of the universities formed student chapters. Those studying public relations were invited to state conferences and chapter seminars.

Today, there are student chapters at Florida State University, University of Central Florida, Rollins College, Bethune-Cookman College, Stetson University, Florida Southern College, Florida Tech, University of West Florida, as well as a student chapter in Jacksonville.

== Accreditation ==
FPRA is a member of the Universal Accreditation Board (UAB), the governing body of the Accreditation in Public Relations (APR) credential. Members can demonstrate their professional skills by sitting for the Accreditation in Public Relations exam. In addition, FPRA offers an even higher level of professional certification, giving members an opportunity to earn the title of Certified Public Relations Counselor.

== PR & Comms Summit ==
Every year the Florida Public Relations Association hosts a professional conference for professionals in public relations and related fields in Florida. For the 2024 iteration of the conference, the FPRA underwent a conference rebranding to the PR & Comms Summit (Presented by FPRA).

The 2024 PR & Comms Summit will be hosted at the Grand Hyatt in Tampa Bay, Florida between August 4 and August 7, 2024. The conference will feature speakers from "...leading brands such as Microsoft, Walt Disney World Resort, Royal Caribbean Group, Paramount/MTV Studios and more."

== 2023-2024 Executive Committee ==
The executive committee is the central governing body of the Florida Public Relations Association. Executive Committee members start and end their terms at FPRA's Annual Conference.

Title	Name
President	Wendy Crites Wacker, APR, CPRC
President-Elect	Julie Frey, APR, CPRC
Immediate Past President	Jay Morgan-Schleuning, APR, CPRC
VP of Annual Conference	Elise Ramer, MBA, APR, CPRC
VP of Communications & PR	Chris Graham, MBA, APR
VP of Credentialing	Kevin Christian, APR, CPRC
VP of Digital Media	Tina Banner, APR, CPRC
VP Diversity, Equity & Inclusion	Melissa DiMaria
VP of Finance	April Salter, APR, CPRC
VP of Golden Image	Lindsay Hudock, APR, CPRC
VP of Membership	Amanda Handley, APR, CPRC
VP of Professional Development	Lindsey Robertson, APR
VP of Research & Planning	Lynn Hobeck Bates, APR, CPRC
VP of Sponsorship Development	Heidi Otway, APR, CPRC
VP of Student Services	Amy Azoulay, APR
Counselors’ Network Chair	Amelia Bell, APR, CPRC
FPRE Foundation Chair	Trish Kapustka, APR, CPRC
LeadershipFPRA Chair	Samantha Senger, APR, CPRC
Executive Director	Cheray Keyes-Shima, APR, CPRC

== Past State Presidents ==
1938 – John W. Dillin, APR, CPRC
1939 – Wilton Martin
1940 – Milton Bacon
1941 – Ray Billings
1942-46 – MacDonald Bryan
1947 – Frank Wright, APR
1948 – Russell Kay
1949 – William Rolleston
1950 – William Wells
1951 – Robert Eastman
1952 – Allen O. Skaggs Jr.
1953 – John W. Dillin, APR, CPRC
1954 – Walter J. Page
1955 – Edward D. Whittlesey, APR
1956 – Wm S. Chambers Jr., APR
1957 – J. Blanford Taylor
1958 – Albert R. McFadyen
1959 – Royce R. Powell
1960 – Cliff D. Davenport
1961 – Jack Shoemaker
1962 – J.S. (Jack) Peters
1963 – Alan B. Fields Jr.
1964 – Philip E. DeBerard Jr.
1965 – Robert E. Philips
1966 – Stirling Turner
1967 – James Hunter
1968 – Robert A. Dahne
1969 – Grover Jones
1970 – James Turner
1971 – Doris Wilkes
1972 – Vernon E. Bradford
1973 – L. John Wachtel
1974 – A. Royce Godshall
1975 – Robert G. Jones
1976 – Bea Quigg
1977 – Roy C. Anderson, APR
1978 – William D. Hunter, APR
1979 – J. Donald Turk, APR
1980 – Wm. V. Fenton Jr., APR
1981 – Dick Whalley
1982 – Joseph J. Curley, APR, CPRC
1983 – Kay Bartholomew, APR
1984 – Patricia Trubow, APR, CPRC
1985 – Bob E. Gernert Jr., APR, CPRC
1986 – Mary A. O’Reilly, APR, CPRC
1987 – Cathlean Coleman, APR
1988 – Bob Davis, Ph.D., APR, CPRC
1989 – Mickey G. Nall, APR, CPRC
1990 – C. Del Galloway, APR, CPRC
1991 – Karen Plunkett, APR
1992 – Donna Z. Davis, APR, CPRC
1993 – Marilyn Waters, APR, CPRC
1994 – Jay Rayburn, II, Ph.D., APR, CPRC
1995 – Virginia Troyer, APR, CPRC
1996 – Janet T. Dennis, APR, CPRC
1997 – Frank Polito, APR, CPRC
1998 – Carol Trivett, APR, CPRC
1999 – Lynn Schneider, APR, CPRC
2000 – Rick Oppenheim, APR, CPRC
2001 – Kathleen M. Giery, APR, CPRC
2002 – Tricia Ridgway-Kapustka, APR, CPRC
2003 – John McShaffrey, APR
2004 – Carole Savage, APR, CPRC
2005 – Leah Lauderdale, APR, CPRC
2006 – Adrienne Moore, APR, CPRC
2007 – Jessica Rye, APR, CPRC
2008 – Suzanne Sparling, APR, CPRC
2009 – Lanette Hart, APR, CPRC
2010 – Sheridan Becht, APR, CPRC
2011 – Jennifer Moss, APR, CPRC
2012 – Melanie Mowry Etters, APR, CPRC
2013 – Jeff Nall, APR, CPRC
2014 – Chris M. Gent, APR, CPRC
2015 – Rachel Smith, APR, CPRC
2016 – Roger Pynn, APR, CPRC
2017 – Terri L. Behling, APR, CPRC
2018 – Ryan Gerds, APR, CPRC
2019 – Gordon Paulus, APR, CPRC
2020-21 – Alyson Gernert, APR, CPRC
2022 – Devon Chestnut, APR, CPRC
2023 – Jay Morgan-Schleuning, APR, CPRC
2024 - Wendy Crites Wacker, APR, CPRC
