= Néstor Amarilla =

Paraguayan playwright

Nestor Amarilla
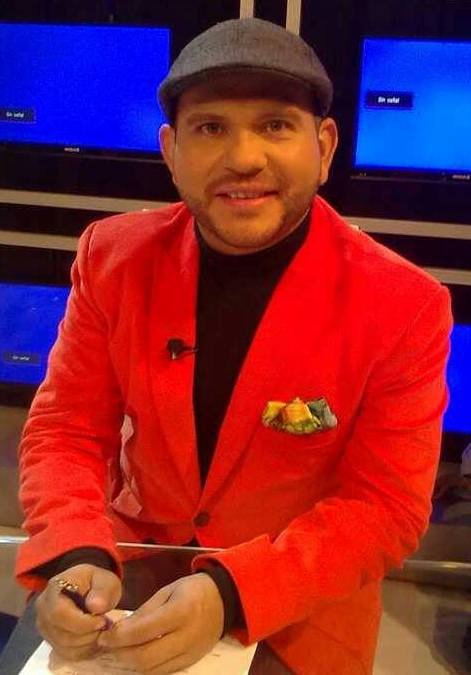
- Born: July 24, 1980; Paraguay
- Occupation: Playwright
- Genre: Drama and comedy

Néstor Salvador Amarilla Acosta (born July 24, 1980) is a playwright from Paraguay.

== Career ==
Hector Amarilla was born July 24, 1980, in Colonia Genaro Romero, near the town of Coronel Oviedo in Paraguay. His father was persecuted by the regime of Alfredo Stroessner. When he was 17 years old he went to the US to study on a scholarship; he completed the US high school requirements then enrolled in Metropolitan State University in Minnesota.

In 2005, his play, “La Pruebera”, was staged in Minneapolis.

In 2006, he co-authored a play with Yacoub Aljaffery called "Born in Iraq" that describes life under the regime of Saddam Hussein, and the two formed a production company called Earth Speak that presented the play at the Mixed Blood Theater in Minneapolis. Amarilla had met Aljaffery while tutoring him in Spanish at Minneapolis Community and Technical College; Aljaffery had grown up under the regime and his father had been murdered by soldiers.

In 2006, he authored another play called "Saved by a Poem", based on the story of his grandmother saving his father's life by submitting a poem to a national competition to honor Stroessner's birthday.

He authored a play about his own experiences under the Stroessner regime called "Fecha Feliz" that was performed in Paraguay in 2009, following some problems with Canal 13 preventing its star from performing.

In 2010, he was nominated for the Nobel Prize of Literature by Professor Fulvia Sanchez de Coronel and artist Joel Filártiga, as one of several hundred names submitted for consideration to the Swedish Academy from writers and academics around the world.

In 2011, his play, “La Pruebera”, was staged in Paraguay; on the same name he released a book of the same name.

== Plays written ==
- "Rosa Americana" (2004) Theater Underground (EU)
- "Vestido Roto" (2005) Teatro de las Americas (Paraguay)
- "Ripped Dress" (2005) Theater Underground (EU)
- "La Pruebera" (2005) Theater Underground (EU)
- "Saved By A Poem" (2006) Teatro del Pueblo (EU)
- "Born in Irak" (2006) Mixed Blood Theater (EU)
- "Fecha Feliz" (2009) Teatro Latino y Teatro Municipal (Paraguay)
- "Che, Che K-nal" (2009) Teatro Latino (Paraguay)

== Books ==
- "Saved By A Poem"
- "Fecha Feliz"
- "La Pruebera"
