= Edelman (firm) =

American public relations company

- Formerly: Daniel J. Edelman and Associates
- Type: Private
- Industry: Public relations
- Founded: 1952; 74 years ago
- Founder: Daniel Edelman
- Headquarters: 250 Hudson Street; New York, NY 10013; U.S.
- Number of locations: 60
- Area served: Worldwide
- Key people: Richard Edelman (CEO); Matthew Harrington (President and COO)
- Revenue: US$1,079m (2022)
- Number of employees: 6,433
- Website: edelman.com

Edelman is a multinational American public relations and marketing consultancy firm. The company was founded in 1952 and named after its founder, Daniel Edelman. Since 1996 and as of November 2023, Edelman has been run by his son Richard Edelman, from its primary headquarters in New York City. Edelman has around 6,000 employees across 60 global offices.

Edelman has been accused of establishing "astroturfing" campaigns (seemingly grassroots groups that are fronts for industry) for its clients. The company has provided services for the fossil fuel industry, which includes earning hundreds of millions of dollars to advocate on behalf of the American Petroleum Institute, a fossil fuel industry group dedicated to the advancement of climate change denial and blocking of climate legislation. It is a partner organization of the World Economic Forum.

== History ==
=== 1952–1960s: Early years ===
Edelman public relations was founded in Chicago, Illinois in 1952 by former journalist Daniel J. Edelman, as Daniel J. Edelman and Associates. The company started with three employees and grew to serve 25 accounts by 1960.

Edelman's founder, Daniel Edelman, is credited with inventing the corporate media tour for his work with his previous employer, Toni Home Permanent Co. He toured the country with "The Toni Twins", a set of twins, where one used a professional salon and the other used Toni's home hair-care products. When Edelman started his own firm, Toni became Edelman's first client. Toni was followed by Sara Lee, a small cheesecake company at the time, and a bowling equipment manufacturer, Brunswick Corporation.

Edelman opened the Manhattan office in 1960. From 1962, Edelman worked with Finland to improve its image, in part through the Finnfacts Institute founded by the company. In 1966, it promoted Californian wine for the California Wine Institute.

In 1977 Edelman secured the landing rights for Concorde. The New York office grew from $1 million to $20 million in revenues from 1979 to the late 1980s under the leadership of Daniel Edelman's son, Richard Edelman.

By 1981, Edelman had five international offices and it opened six more over the following decade. Some former employees and industry experts said its focus on financial growth led to high turnover and client service issues as a result. There was also an unsuccessful attempt by some employees to start their own firm with some of Edelman's clients.

=== 1990–2000 ===
Richard Edelman was named Global CEO of the eponymous firm in 1996. He took over for his father Daniel J. Edelman, who remained Chairman of Edelman until he died in 2013 at the age of 92. In the 1990s, offices were opened in Mexico, Brazil, Argentina, Germany, Spain, South Korea, China, and Belgium. In the United States, a Silicon Valley office was opened in 1992 to serve technology clients, and in Sacramento, California, in 1994. It also opened offices in Florida, Georgia, and Washington. The firm grew to $70 million in revenues by 1994.

In 1995, Edelman was the first public relations firm to have a website and began web-based projects for its clients. By the early 2000s it grew to $210 million with about 25% of revenues coming from Europe. In September 2010, Edelman acquired a Houston-based firm, Vollmer public relations.

=== 2000–2020 ===
In 2000, Edelman published its first edition of Trust Barometer. In 2002, the firm shortened its name from Edelman Public Relations Worldwide to Edelman.

In 2004, Edelman collaborated with the advertising firm Ogilvy & Mather to create Dove's Campaign for Real Beauty. Edelman conducted public relations and market research for the campaign, which included approximately 3,000 interviews with women in 10 different countries.

In 2005, Edelman took over marketing and public relations management for the American Heart Association's Go Red for Women campaign.

The 2008 edition of the Go Red for Women campaign ran by Edelman came in third among disease awareness campaigns at the 2009 Clio Awards.

By 2012, it had established the Edelman Digital division with about 600 staff and about half of its work was social media-related. In April same year, the firm introduced its Business and Social Purpose division. Later in June 2012, the firm worked with Symantec to promote the Norton brand of antivirus software. It also introduced the Employee Engagement Connections Index in October alongside opening a new office in Turkey.

In January 2013, the firm launched The Daniel J. Edelman China Group. In May 2013, Edelman expanded into South Africa by acquiring Baird's Renaissance, which had previously been affiliated with Edelman for 20 years.

Edelman launched a joint venture with United Talent Agency in 2014 that resulted in the formation of a unit called United Entertainment Group (UEG).

In 2015, the firm moved into Colombia by acquiring Position Comunicaciones. In the same year, Edelman worked on REI's OptOutside, a Black Friday campaign during which REI closed its stores and encouraged its customers to spend the day outdoors. OptOutside won the Titanium Grand Prix at the 2016 Cannes Lions Festival.

Equifax hired Edelman for crisis control after the October 2017 privacy breach.

In January 2018, it was reported that India's Tata Group account, which had been handled by Edelman (in association with Rediffusion) since 2011, was moved to Adfactors PR.

In 2019, PRWeek recognized the Campaign for Real Beauty as its Best U.S. Campaign of the Past 20 Years.

=== 2020–present ===
In 2022, Edelman surpassed $1 billion in global annual revenue, making them the first $1 billion PR agency. That year also marked the firm's 70th anniversary. On October 1, 2022, it inaugurated the Edelman Museum, a space within its Chicago offices. In the same year, Edelman worked with Vaseline on the See My Skin campaign, which sought to build an image database that would make it easier for medical professionals to diagnose skin conditions in people of color. See My Skin won two awards at the 2022 Cannes Lions Festival and was a silver award winner at the Clios.

In 2022, Edelman was the largest public relations firm in the world by revenue,

Edelman's Streetcode campaign with HP was recognized at the 2023 Global SABRE Awards, where it received a Platinum SABRE for best public relations campaign of the year.

== People and governance ==
The firm is led by Richard Edelman, who assumed the CEO role in 1996. Victor Malanga has been Edelman's global CFO since 2007.

Matthew Harrington, a 35-year Edelman veteran and then Chief Operating Officer, was named Global President of the firm in 2019. Judy John was named Edelman's first-ever Global Chief Creative Officer in February 2019.

Lisa Osborne Ross was named CEO of Edelman's U.S. operation in April 2021. Ross became the first Black woman to run a PR operation of that size. Ross announced in October 2023 that she was leaving the firm. In January 2024, Kirsty Graham took over as Edelman's U.S. CEO.

In May 2022, Soni Basi joined the firm as its Chief People Officer. In May 2023, Edelman named Ed Williams its first international president, overseeing its APAC, EMEA, Canadian and Latin American operations.

Edelman announced towards the end of 2024 that it planned to cut 330 employees worldwide, with most reductions in the US and 15% in Asia.

== Products and services ==
Edelman's most well-known product is the Trust Barometer, a survey designed to measure the public's level of trust in business, government, media, and NGOs. Its findings have been cited in publications such as the New York Times, Financial Times, and Economist. The firm has published the Trust Barometer on an annual basis since 2000. The 2024 edition polled approximately 32,000 people living in 28 different countries.

In 2021, Edelman launched Edelman Global Advisory, a public affairs firm that counsels businesses on government relations, crisis management, and social justice matters. EGA has expanded since 2021 by acquiring public affairs firms with offices in Brazil, Belgium, Singapore, and the United Kingdom.

In 2015, Edelman acquired the UK-based investor relations firm Smithfield. This acquisition led to the creation of Edelman Smithfield, a financial communications team that operated within the agency. In 2022, Edelman Smithfield was launched globally as its own boutique firm. Also in 2022, Edelman created the Gen Z Lab, an arm of the firm that advises businesses on marketing to Generation Z. The lab is led by fashion designer Harris Reed and Edelman chief brand officer Jackie Cooper.

== Controversies ==
Edelman has a history of establishing astroturf campaigns (seemingly grassroots groups that are fronts for industry) for its clients. The company has created front groups and advised clients to plant articles, letters and opinion pieces that appear to be spontaneous testimonials.

=== Microsoft antitrust ===
In April 1998, the Los Angeles Times reported that Edelman had drafted a campaign plan to ensure that state attorneys general did not join antitrust legal actions against Microsoft. Documents obtained by the LA Times revealed that the plan included generating supportive letters to the editor, opinion pieces, and articles by freelance writers. The LA Times said the plan included, "unusual and some say unethical tactics, including the planting of articles, letters to the editor and opinion pieces to be commissioned by Microsoft's top media handlers but presented by local firms as spontaneous testimonials".

=== Working Families for Wal-Mart front group ===
In the 2000s, Edelman created a front group called the Working Families for Wal-Mart, which said it was a grassroots organization, but was actually funded by Wal-Mart. It paid two bloggers to travel the country interviewing Wal-Mart employees, one of whom was a senior Edelman employee's sister. According to The New Yorker, "everyone she talked to was delighted with Wal-Mart". In 2006, BusinessWeek reported that the public relations effort, which was positioned as a grassroots blog, was actually paid for by Wal-Mart. The New Yorker called it a "blatant example of astroturfing".

In 2007, it was reported that Wal-Mart paid Edelman approximately $10 million annually.

=== Fossil fuel companies and climate change deniers ===
According to The Washington Post, Edelman's "work with the fossil fuel industry has been under scrutiny for years." According to a 2021 study, Edelman is a major factor in the climate issue arena.

In 2008 Edelman's work with E.ON, which planned to build a coal power station at Kingsnorth attracted protests at Edelman's UK headquarters. In 2009, to coincide with the weeklong "Climate Camp" range of protests, a group of naked protestors occupied Edelman's reception.

From 2008 to 2011, Edelman was paid an average of $68.9 million a year by the American Petroleum Institute, which has been dedicated to the advancement of climate change denial and blocking of climate legislation. Analysts estimate that Edelman earned at least $100 million more from the organization. Edelman used front groups to help the American Petroleum Institute reduce the perceived environmental damage caused by oil companies.

In the 2010s, Edelman was commissioned by TransCanada Corporation to run campaigns supporting the Keystone XL pipeline, a proposed (but eventually canceled in 2021) pipeline to carry crude from Canada's oil sands to refineries on the Gulf coast of Texas. Edelman also developed a strategy for the proposed Energy East pipeline intended to carry oil through Québec, en route to a deep water harbor at Cacouna, Quebec for export abroad in supertankers and to refineries in New Brunswick. This resulted in a major controversy when documents leaked to Greenpeace revealed that Edelman had made some unethical proposals to sway public opinion in favor of its client. TransCanada distanced itself from those proposals as soon as the "dirty tricks" were published in the press. In 2015, the firm said that it would cease work for coal producers and climate change deniers.

In June 2016, Edelman was hired by the International Centre for Legal Protection (ICLP), led by Andrey Kondakov, former director in the Russian Ministry of Foreign Affairs. The company was hired to "turn the tide of public opinion" and "help influence U.S. opinion on a massive court verdict involving the oil giant Yukos."

The company was still working for oil and gas companies in 2022.

In 2024 it was revealed that Edelman was working with the Koch network, despite Edelman making climate pledges.

=== Conflict of interest concerns ===
In July 2014, the Chinese People's Daily reported that Rui Chenggang, a star anchor at China's state-run CCTV held a 7.9 percent stake in Edelman PR's Chinese subsidiary, Pegasus Communications. Pegasus provided PR services to CCTV, raising concerns about conflicts of interest.

=== Private prison industry ===
Edelman supported private prison company GEO Group and helped in "laundering the reputation of private US concentration camps" in July 2019. In May 2019, executives from the Washington, D.C. office, including office president Lisa Ross and former Trump White House deputy press secretary Lindsay Walters, went to Florida to present the pitch. In June, when word spread across the company that the work was being pursued, debate sprang up on networking app Fishbowl. The work was resigned by Edelman in July 2019 and announced during an all-hands meeting in Washington. On Fishbowl, an employee commented that the executives "took the opportunity to basically shame us for ruining the work for the company because they couldn't trust us not to leak it to the press." Other employees on Fishbowl made similar comments.

The company's official response was that "Edelman takes on complex and diverse clients ... and ultimately decided not to proceed with this work." Edelman also refused to confirm they did similar work for another major private prison company, CoreCivic.

=== Saudi PR ===
The firm has provided services to the government of Saudi Arabia. Edelman and Saudi Arabia have contracts worth about $9.6 million (£7.9m) signed over the four years up to 2022. Freedom House has named the Kingdom as one of the "worst of the worst" countries globally as far as human rights, political and civil liberties are concerned. During the time of Jamal Khashoggi's murder, Edelman was one of the many PR firms to help Saudi Arabia work on its global reputation. The firm received or contracted $9.6 million in fees from the agencies and companies controlled by the Gulf regime, according to US Department of Justice filing documents published by watchdog group OpenSecrets.

== See also ==
- StrategyOne
