= Como tú no hay 2 =

Spanish-language comedy-drama TV series

- Genre: Comedy drama
- Created by: Ximena Suárez
- Based on: Amores de mercado by Fernando Aragón and Arnaldo Madrid
- Written by: Julián Aguilar; Isabel de Sara; Mauricio Jalife
- Directed by: Luis Manzo; Carlos Cock Marín
- Creative director: Claudia Vergara
- Theme music composer: Stefano Vieni; Jessica Díaz Chávez
- Opening theme: "Como tú no hay dos" by Jessica Díaz
- Country of origin: Mexico
- Original language: Spanish
- No. of seasons: 1
- No. of episodes: 75

Production
- Executive producer: Carlos Bardasano
- Producer: María Eugenia Fernández
- Production location: Mexico City, Mexico
- Cinematography: Adrián Patiño; Ignacio González
- Editor: Alba Merchán Hamann
- Camera setup: Multi-camera
- Production companies: W Studios; Lemon Studios; Televisa

Original release
- Network: Las Estrellas
- Release: 24 February – 5 June 2020

Related
- Amor descarado; ¿Quién es quién?

Como tú no hay 2 (originally written as Como tú no hay dos English: No one like you), is a Spanish-language comedy-drama television series produced by W Studios and Lemon Studios for Televisa and Univision. It stars Adrián Uribe and Claudia Martín. The production of the series began on 26 September 2019 in Mexico City, Mexico.

On 10 January 2020, People en Español confirmed that the series is a new adaptation of the Chilean telenovela Amores de mercado, whose most recent version was ¿Quién es quién? produced in 2015. The series premiered in Mexico on 24 February 2020 on Las Estrellas.

An extended version of the series is available on Blim TV and has a total of 85 episodes.

== Plot ==
The series revolves around Toño (Adrián Uribe), who accidentally discovers that he possibly has a twin brother named Ricardo (Uribe), a high-class man who works at a large company. After Ricardo suffers an accident, Toño replaces him and lives an idyllic of love next to Natalia (Claudia Martín), a woman who was engaged to Ricardo. After the accident, Ricardo suffers from amnesia and begins a relationship with his neighbor Fabiana (Estefanía Hinojosa), a nice, simple, and honest young woman who has been in love with Tono since they were kids. Little by little, Ricardo suspects that the life he is living isn't his, and will try to discover the truth.

== Cast ==
=== Main ===
- Adrián Uribe as Antonio "Toño" Cortés Molina / Ricardo Reyes Alonso
- Claudia Martín as Natalia "Naty" Lira Vargas
- Azela Robinson as Luz María Molina de Cortés "Luchita"
- Ferdinando Valencia as Damián Fuentes Jasso
- Aylín Mújica as Oriana Jasso
- Alejandro Ávila as Germán Muñoz
- Sergio Reynoso as Félix Cortés "El Bacalao"
- María Fernanda García as Amelia Campos "La Pastora"
- María de la Fuente as Charlotte Burgos
- Gerardo Murguía as Claudio Reyes Alonso
- Lore Graniewicz as Renata Cortés
- Cecilia Romo as Doña Remedios
- Leticia Huijara as Sol Morales
- Henry Zakka as Federico "Fede" Mercurio
- Juan Pablo Gil as Adán Orozco Campos
- Jessica Díaz as Tina Rebolledo
- José Carlos Femat as Daniel Silva
- Juana Arias as Valeria Fuentes Jasso
- Gema Garoa as Luna Morales
- Gabriela Carrillo as Ivette Altamira
- Carlos Said as Luis Ramírez
- Lucía Silva as Mariana Díaz
- Giovanna Romo as Estrella Morales
- Héctor Holten as Edgar Orozco
- Mayra Rojas as Dora Sánchez
- Ramiro Tomasini as Diego
- Mario Alberto Monroy as Benjamín Cruz "Crucita"
- Estefanía Hinojosa as Fabiana Orozco Campos

== Ratings ==
=== Mexico ratings ===
Viewership and ratings per season of Como tú no hay 2
Season	Timeslot (CT)	Episodes	First aired		Last aired		Avg. viewers (millions)
Season	Timeslot (CT)	Episodes	Date	Viewers (millions)	Date	Viewers (millions)	Avg. viewers (millions)
1	Mon–Fri 8:30pm	75	24 February 2020	4.1	5 June 2020	4.1	3.03

=== U.S. ratings ===
Viewership and ratings per season of Como tú no hay 2
Season	Timeslot (ET)	Episodes	First aired		Last aired		Avg. viewers (millions)
Season	Timeslot (ET)	Episodes	Date	Viewers (millions)	Date	Viewers (millions)	Avg. viewers (millions)
1	Mon–Fri 10pm/9c	85	27 April 2020	2.11	25 August 2020	1.83	1.60

== Episodes ==
No.	Title	Original release date	Mexico viewers (millions)
1	"Toño usurpa la vida de Ricardo"	24 February 2020 (Note: Premiered early online through Las Estrellas website on 21 February 2020.)	4.1
Ricardo is run over right at the moment he meets Toño for the first time. Toño unwilling takes the place of Ricardo as he attempted to stop the wedding of Ricardo and Natalia to explain that Ricardo was hit by a car.
2	"Un sueño del cual no quiero despertar"	25 February 2020	3.4
Toño suffers in his first meeting in Reyes Alonso and Ricardo feels that he does not belong to the place where he is.
3	"De chivo los tamales"	26 February 2020	3.3
Toño finds Damián in a dressing gown at Natalia's house. Fabiana confesses to ‘Toño’ that she is pregnant.
4	"Quédate conmigo esta noche"	27 February 2020	3.7
Natalia tries to seduce ‘Toño’. Estefanía decides to have the baby and Toño hires Benjamín as her personal assistant.
5	"Curso de modales fifís"	28 February 2020	3.4
‘Toño’ visits El Bacalao in prison and he is surprised by the attitude of his son. Oriana demands Claudio to evict Dora from the house.
6	"¡Ay Papantla, tus hijos vuelan!"	2 March 2020	3.4
Fabiana rejects the help of ‘Toño’ to take care of the baby and ‘Ricardo’ is discovered by Benja, who vows to keep his secret.
7	"El nuevo presidente de Reyes Alonso"	3 March 2020	3.3
Because of ‘Ricardo’, the company loses a large amount of money; Claudio removes him from office. Benja does Toño a favor.
8	"‘Ricardo’ y Natalia hacen el amor"	4 March 2020	3.2
‘Ricardo’ confesses his love to Natalia and they spend the night together. ‘Toño’ wants to apply for the position of administrative assistant in Reyes Alonso.
9	"¡Cierren las puertas!"	5 March 2020	3.2
Toño and Benja prevent Ricardo from entering Reyes Alonso. El Bacalao returns home and Natalia suffers an accident because of Damián and ‘Ricardo’.
10	"Recuperar el tiempo perdido"	6 March 2020	3.0
‘Toño’ is reunited with El Bacalao, but he rejects him. ‘Ricardo’ inquires about his past and Oriana asks Natalia to separate from Damián.
11	"¡Hijo de toda tu Luz María madre!"	9 March 2020	3.2
La Pastora catches 'Ricardo' kissing Natalia. Germán and Luchita break up and Natalia asks ‘Ricardo’ to get married as soon as possible.
12	"Dar gato por liebre"	10 March 2020	3.1
‘Ricardo’ agrees to marry Natalia. Fabiana does not want to know anything about ‘Toño’ and the real Toño meets El Bacalao.
13	"Sobre advertencia no hay engaño"	11 March 2020	2.9
‘Toño’ asks Fabiana for an opportunity. El Bacalao catches Germán with Luchita and Fabiana ends up in the hospital.
14	"Acepto casarme con mi Natita chula"	12 March 2020	3.2
‘Ricardo’ and Natalia finally get married, but Damián suffers at the wedding. Estrella blames ‘Toño’ for stealing Don Fede's money.
15	"En mi otra vida no fui tan afortunado"	13 March 2020	3.2
While ‘Ricardo’ is very happy next to Natalia, Renata confronts Valeria, ‘Toño’ threatens Bacalao. Damián and Fabiana meet each other.
16	"Es mejor pedir perdón que pedir permiso"	16 March 2020	2.6
‘Ricardo’ sends Fabiana money after losing her baby and ‘Toño’ will suspect that someone is posing as him.
17	"Trastorno de personalidad múltiple"	17 March 2020	3.0
Charlotte wants ‘Toño’ to live with her to study his case. Ivette believes that Damián has a relationship with Fabiana.
18	"Baño de agua fría"	18 March 2020	3.2
Adán and Tina confess their love. El Bacalao and Germán fight over Luchita. ‘Toño’ goes to live with Charlotte and Betty threatens Natalia.
19	"¡Hombre armado!"	19 March 2020	3.1
Natalia questions Damián about Fabiana. Luchita confesses the truth to ‘Toño’. Germán saves Mariana from an assailant in the market.
20	"La amnesia ya se me pasó a la lengua"	20 March 2020	3.1
The real Toño visits Luchita for dinner and threatens to Bacalao. Damián kisses Fabiana. Adán asks Tina to join the Divine Flame.
21	"No soy Toño, ¡Soy Ricardo!"	23 March 2020	3.0
Charlotte subjects ‘Toño’ to regressive hypnosis and remembers something about his childhood. Natalia visits Fabiana to get the truth out of Damián.
22	"Échale más limón a la herida"	24 March 2020	3.2
Charlotte deceives Fabiana and makes a confession to ‘Toño’. Renata finds Luis with Valeria and Luchita remembers a pain from the past.
23	"¿Eres gay?"	25 March 2020	2.6
Damián breaks up with Ivette and she questions his sexuality, but the gossip reaches Natalia and ‘Ricardo’. Don Fede disappears, which is suspected if the curse has fallen on him?
24	"Se está poniendo dura la cosa"	26 March 2020	2.9
Sol wants to do the wake of Don Fede at his home. Fabiana tells Natalia that Damián kissed her and ‘Ricardo’ gives Damián permission to see his wife.
25	"Claudio le pide matrimonio a Oriana"	27 March 2020	2.8
Oriana pretends to be a good woman and Claudio falls before her deception. Tina ends her relationship with Adán and Natalia is determined to separate from Ricardo.
26	"Toda mi vida es una gran mentira"	30 March 2020	2.6
While Natalia gets drunk, ‘Ricardo’ takes Damián to the club where Tina works, La Pastora and Don Edgar fight.
27	"¡Ricardo y Toño se encuentran!"	31 March 2020	2.9
Ricardo and Toño find each other in a store. Charlotte demands that Fabiana stay away from ‘Toño’.
28	"Armar mi propio rompecabezas"	1 April 2020	2.9
‘Toño’ is sure that he is not the real Antonio. Luchita suspects that her other son might be alive and El Bacalao discovers everything.
29	"El Bacalao descubre la usurpación de Toño"	2 April 2020	2.9
El Bacalao follows Benja and arrives at Reyes Alonso to speak with the real Toño. ‘Toño’ and Fabiana make love.
30	"Pícnic en el parque"	3 April 2020	2.9
‘Toño’ and Fabiana enjoy a day together. Damián finds Oriana with Diego and the Morales curse could have ended.
31	"Esas pulgas no brincan en tus tapetes"	6 April 2020	2.8
Damián tries to seduce Fabiana, but she rejects him. Natalia faints in front of ‘Ricardo’, Renata and Vale face each other in a game of pool.
32	"Problemas de reproducción"	7 April 2020	2.8
The doctor informs Natalia and ‘Ricardo’ that they will not be able to have children; she believes that it is a punishment for the evil that she has done to him.
33	"Natalia le pide el divorcio a ‘Ricardo’"	8 April 2020	2.7
Natalia does not want ‘Ricardo’ to sacrifice himself because of her. Valeria and Renata have a very "enchilada" meal, and Toño faces Bacalao.
34	"Adán descubre la profesión de Tina"	9 April 2020	2.8
Adán arrives at the Burro Loco due to intrigues from La Pastora and sees Tina dancing. Luchita tells Renata that she loves Germán.
35	"Damián le pide otra oportunidad a Fabiana"	10 April 2020	2.3
Damián gives Fabiana a ring and tells her that he wants something formal with her. Adán breaks up with Tina.
36	"Dale vuelta a la hoja"	13 April 2020	2.6
‘Toño’ asks Luchita and Bacalao if he has another brother. Natalia proposes to ‘Ricardo’ to adopt a baby.
37	"Natalia termina con Damián"	14 April 2020	3.0
Natalia discovers that Damián gave Fabiana a ring and decides to end their relationship; ‘Ricardo’ is worried about her.
38	"Los análisis de ADN"	15 April 2020	2.8
‘Toño’ discovers that he is the son of Luchita and El Bacalao, but he does not accept it. Natalia tells Oriana that Damián is dating Fabiana.
39	"Luchita descubre que su hijo ‘Pablito’ está vivo"	16 April 2020	3.0
Luchita is sure that her other son did not die and that El Bacalao gave it to Dora. Oriana tries to buy Fabiana.
40	"No me dejes nunca"	17 April 2020	2.7
While Natalia seems increasingly in love with ‘Ricardo’, ‘Toño’ apologizes to Luchita. La Pastora and Tina face each other.
41	"Tú no vas a cambiar ni aunque renazcas 10 veces"	20 April 2020	2.8
Fabiana catches ‘Toño’ kissing Charlotte. Vale and Renata are arrested. Sol ends her relationship with Don Fede.
42	"El pacto se acabó"	21 April 2020	2.9
Natalia ends her plan with Damián, but he threatens her. Luna saves Murillo from death and El Bacalao searches for Dora.
43	"Aquí la única tonta fui yo"	22 April 2020	3.0
Fabiana does not want to know more about ‘Toño’, so she speaks to Damián. Luis ends his relationship with Vale. La Pastora and Tina decide to get drunk together.
44	"No vas a callarme más"	23 April 2020	3.1
Luchita faces Bacalao because she knows that ‘Pablito’ is alive. Fabiana agrees to be Damián's girlfriend. La Pastora goes into depression.
45	"¡Que explote la bomba!"	24 April 2020	2.9
El Bacalao hurts Luchita with a knife. Damián makes it clear to Natalia that he is not to be played with. Toño wants to see his mother no matter what happens.
46	"Hoy me regreso a mi verdadera casa"	27 April 2020	3.0
‘Ricardo’ decides to return to Toño to be close to Luchita. Charlotte is now sure that there are two Antonios Cortés.
47	"Damián pide la mano de Fabiana"	28 April 2020	2.7
Damián talks to La Pastora to allow him to marry Fabiana and also, he proposes to Natalia to set a trap for 'Ricardo'.
48	"¡Changos en el mecate!"	29 April 2020	2.8
Charlotte discovers that ‘Ricardo’ does exist and ‘Toño’ has a twin. Damián begins the plan against ‘Ricardo’.
49	"‘Ricardo’ cae en la trampa de Natalia"	30 April 2020	2.7
Natalia gets ‘Ricardo’ to sign the papers. Charlotte shows El Bacalao the proof of the twins.
50	"Esposa de uno y amante de otro"	1 May 2020	2.8
Fabiana catches Damián kissing Natalia and confronts her ‘friend’. El Bacalao steals Charlotte's hard drive, but it falls into Renata's hands.
51	"Luis y Renata descubren a los gemelos"	4 May 2020	2.7
While Luis finds a photo of ‘Toño’ with the Reyes Alonso, Renata watches the video where they appear together. Fabiana ends her relationship with Damián.
52	"¡Como perro apaleado!"	5 May 2020	2.6
Reyes Alonso loses millions of dollars due to ‘Ricardo’ and thanks to Damián's plan. Renata and Luis see ‘Ricardo’ and Oriana gets a divorce.
53	"El Bacalao manda a matar a Charlotte"	6 May 2020	3.4
To prevent everything from being discovered, El Bacalao pays to eliminate Charlotte. The Morales restaurant catches fire.
54	"A lo hecho, pecho"	7 May 2020	3.3
‘Toño’ demands from Luchita the truth about his twin brother. Natalia is afraid of being caught in the fraud. ‘Ricardo’ resigns Reyes Alonso.
55	"El lado oscuro del Bacalao"	8 May 2020	3.0
El Bacalao threatens 'Toño' to kill him if he opens his mouth; Luchita discovers that her husband sold ‘Pablito’ to Dora.
56	"Aquí hay gato encerrado"	11 May 2020	3.0
Luchita tells the whole truth to ‘Toño’; he despises her. Renata finds ‘Ricardo’, but runs away so they don't discover him.
57	"¡Llegó la hora!"	12 May 2020	3.0
‘Ricardo’ suspects that ‘Toño’ already knows the truth; ‘Toño’ wants to confront him for stealing his identity.
58	"¡Ricardo recupera la memoria!"	13 May 2020	3.0
After suffering an accident, Ricardo remembers his entire past and decides to denounce Toño for supplanting his life.
59	"¡Quiero que me devuelva a mi cachorro!"	14 May 2020	3.1
El Bacalao requires Claudio to deliver ‘Ricardo’. 'Toño' says goodbye to Fabiana and Damián discovers Ivette in his office.
60	"Cuervos en el maizal"	15 May 2020	3.3
Claudio pays El Bacalao to keep quiet. Natalia stops Damián and Ricardo wants to appear before the Reyes Alonso.
61	"Como palo de gallinero"	18 May 2020	3.0
Ricardo discovers that Toño married Natalia. El Bacalao tells Toño that the best thing to do is run away from the Reyes Alonso.
62	"Un día especial"	19 May 2020	2.7
‘Ricardo’ and Claudio spend a moment together in the park. Natalia faces Damián and the real Ricardo has a plan against Toño.
63	"Hasta que nos vemos las caras"	20 May 2020	3.1
Ricardo confronts Toño, reveals the truth of his origin and proposes a plan to avoid sending him to jail.
64	"A mí no me importa nada ya"	21 May 2020	3.0
Toño confronts El Bacalao for having hidden the truth from his brother. Ricardo returns to the Reyes Alonso house.
65	"Nadie tiene el destino comprado"	22 May 2020	3.2
Valeria prevents Oriana and Claudio's wedding; he cancels the marriage. Damián threatens Natalia and Ricardo discovers that she fell in love with Toño.
66	"Voy a fingir un tiempo más"	25 May 2020	3.0
Ricardo decides not to reveal the truth and continue in the role that Toño had played. Claudio asks Oriana to leave the house.
67	"Nuestra familia se está desmoronando"	26 May 2020	2.8
Damián discovers that Ricardo is not Sofia's son. Claudio threatens El Bacalao with putting him in jail if he tells the truth to his son.
68	"Amor de lejos, para tarugos y conejos"	27 May 2020	3.0
‘Toño’ and Fabiana have a romantic date and Natalia dies of jealousy. Toño burns with fever and Oriana returns to the Reyes Alonso house.
69	"No te quiero cerca de mi vida"	28 May 2020	3.0
Ricardo threatens Damián with death and despises Natalia; He assures her that he has never loved her and will not adopt a child with her.
70	"Medidas drásticas"	29 May 2020	3.1
Claudio names Damián president of the Reyes Alonso company; He mocks Ricardo, Luchita and Dora decide to go to Veracruz to look for Socorro.
71	"Ricardo y Toño se enfrentan a golpes"	1 June 2020	3.1
Toño beats Ricardo for speaking ill of Natalia, but he responds the aggression. Dora discovers the truth of the twins.
72	"Si mamá, soy tu hijo"	2 June 2020	3.2
Luchita finally finds the son who was taken from her and Ricardo embraces her with love. El Bacalao escapes from the police and Fabiana does not want to see Ricardo.
73	"Nunca podré amar a un hombre como tú"	3 June 2020	3.6
Natalia finds out the truth and confronts Toño. Ricardo and Toño fight, but Luchita tries to unite them. El Bacalao tries to kill Luchita.
74	"¿Por qué hay 2 Ricardos?"	4 June 2020	3.5
Ricardo and Toño arrive at the party at the Reyes Alonso's house and everyone is shocked. Damián takes revenge against the twins.
75	"Boda por partida doble"	5 June 2020	4.1
Ricardo saves Toño's life and together later, they join their lives to the women they love. Damián ends his days in prison.
