= Kathleen Kelly (biologist) =

American biologist

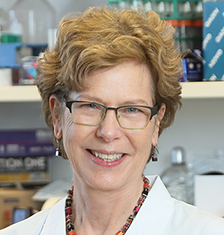
- Born: 1954 (age 71–72)
- Education: University of California, Irvine (PhD)
- Scientific career
- Fields: Cancer biology
- Workplaces: National Cancer Institute
- Thesis: Genetic and biochemical aspects of B lymphocytes responses to bacterial lipopolysaccharides (1980)

Kathleen Jacobs Kelly (born 1954) is an American biologist specializing in genetic regulation of cell growth, cancer progression, and metastasis. She is chief of the laboratory of genitourinary cancer pathogenesis (LGCP) and deputy director of the National Cancer Institute Center for Cancer Research.

== Education ==
Kelly earned a Ph.D. degree from the University of California, Irvine. Her 1980 dissertation was titled Genetic and biochemical aspects of B lymphocytes responses to bacterial lipopolysaccharides. She completed postdoctoral training in the laboratory of Philip Leder, Harvard Medical School.

== Career ==
Kelly has maintained an independent research program at the National Cancer Institute (NCI) since 1984. She is chief of the laboratory of genitourinary cancer pathogenesis (LGCP) and deputy director of the NCI Center for Cancer Research.

=== Research ===
Kelly's interests have focused on the genetic regulation of cell growth, cancer progression and metastasis. Her program investigates mechanisms of prostate cancer tumorigenesis and progression. A major area of focus addresses the roles of oncogenotype, tumor heterogeneity/cancer stem cells, and metabolism in the development of therapeutic responses, especially for castrate resistant prostate cancer. Additional research investigates signal transduction pathways that influence prostate cancer bone metastasis. As chief of LGCP, Kelly advances integration with the clinical prostate cancer program to carry out mechanism-based translational research using a variety of pathological, genomic, and patient-derived live culture approaches.
