= Public Relations Society of America =

Nonprofit trade association for public relations professionals

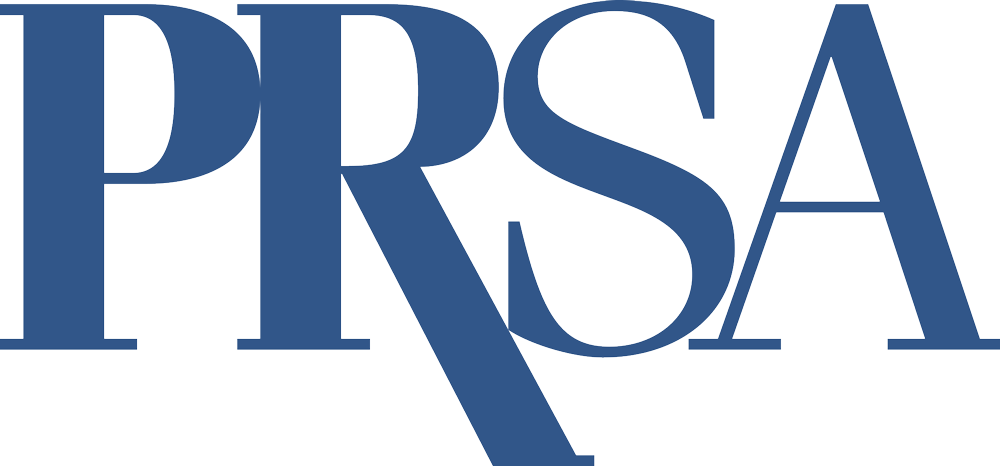
- Abbreviation: PRSA
- Predecessor: American Council on Public Relations and National Association of Public Relations Council
- Formation: 1947 (agreement); February 4, 1948; 78 years ago (charter granted)
- Type: Not-for-profit trade and business association
- Headquarters: New York, New York
- Region served: The United States, Argentina, Colombia, Peru and Puerto Rico
- Members: 30,000
- Chair: Heide Harrell, M.A., APR
- CEO: Matthew Marcial
- Website: www.prsa.org

The Public Relations Society of America (PRSA) is a 501(c)(6) not-for-profit organization trade association serving the public relations and communications community. It was founded in 1947 by merging the American Council on Public Relations and the National Association of Public Relations Councils. That same year, it held its first annual conference and award ceremony.

In 1950, the society created its first code of professional standards, and the current PRSA code of ethics was last updated in 2000. PRSA also launched an accreditation program and a student society called the Public Relations Student Society of America in 1968.

== History ==
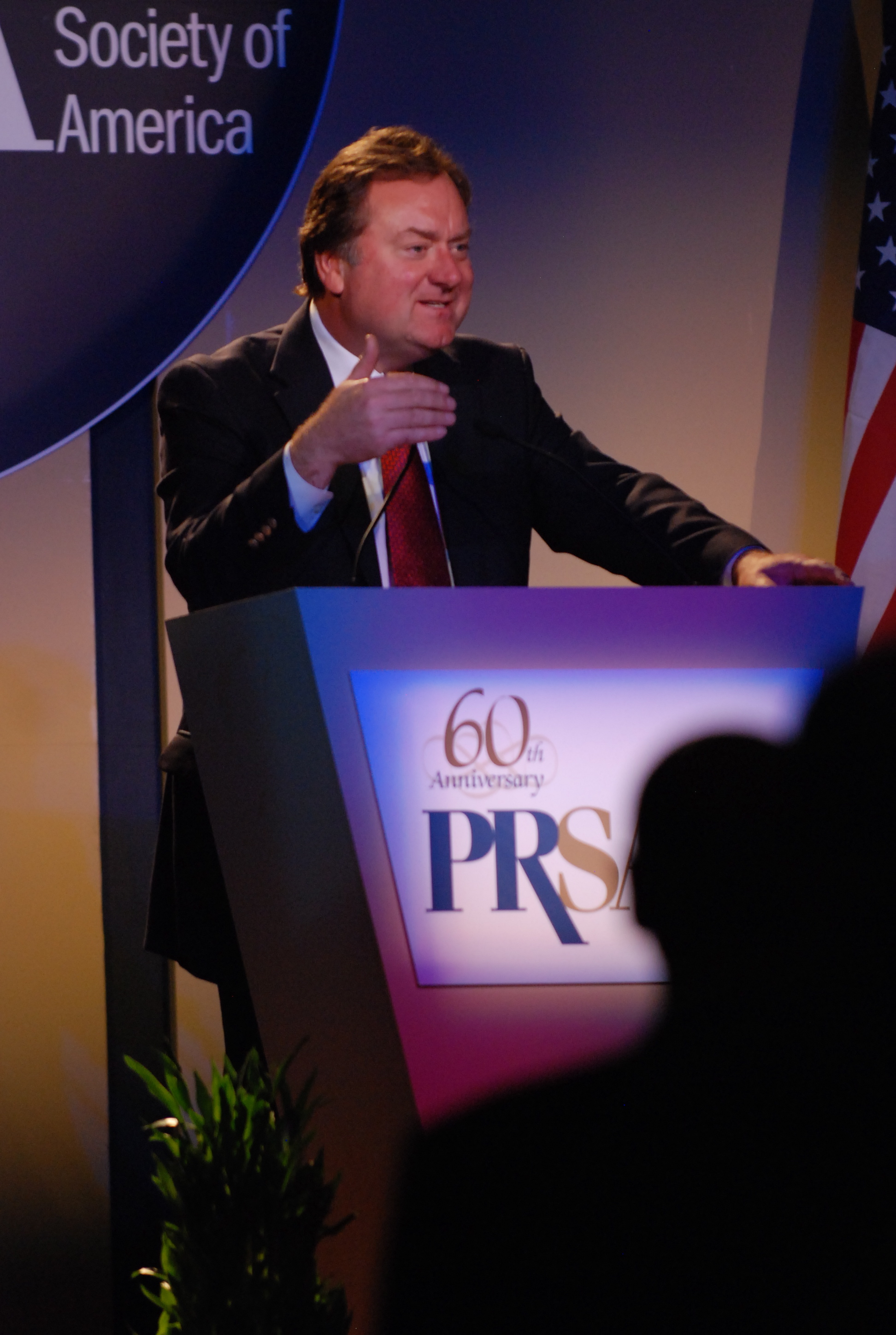
Tim Russert speaks at the plenary session of the 2007 PRSA international conference.

The Public Relations Society of America was formed in 1947 by combining the American Council on Public Relations and the National Association of Public Relations Councils. The society had its first annual conference in Philadelphia, where Richard Falk was given PRSA's first "annual citation" for advancing the field of public relations.

Several ethical violations in the field led to discussions about ethics within the society. The society published its first code of conduct and Anvil awards two years later. The code of conduct was later ratified in 1959, and PRSA became the only public relations organization with "an enforceable code" when a Grievance Board was created in 1962 — a process that remained in place until the Code was substantially revised in 2000.

PRSA merged with the American Public Relations Association in 1961 and started its accreditation program for public relations professionals the next year. The Public Relations Student Society of America (PRSSA) was created in 1967 based on suggestions by Professor Walter Seifer of Ohio State University.

In the 1970s to early 1980s, PRSA's female membership base increased, coinciding with more women pursuing a career in the field. PRSA had its first female president in 1972 and a second female President in 1983. In 1981, 78 percent of PRSA's student society were women, up from 38 percent in 1968. The society grew to 9,000 members by 1981, up from 4,500 members in 1960.

In 1977, the Federal Trade Commission (FTC) said PRSA's code of conduct inhibited fair competition by requiring members not to solicit clients from other members. It issued a consent order that required PRSA to remove content from its code of conduct that contained sexist language, discouraged soliciting clients from other members, or encouraged price-fixing activities. PRSA's first definition of public relations was created in 1982 as "Public relations helps an organization and its publics adapt mutually to each other." In 1986, PRSA's then President Anthony Franco resigned from his post after it was revealed he was accused of insider trading by the U.S. Securities and Exchange Commission. The PRSA's philanthropy arm, the PRSA Foundation, was founded in 1990.

In 1994, O'Dwyer from the O'Dwyer's PR trade journal alleged that PRSA was violating copyright laws by lending articles from USA Today, The New York Times, O'Dwyer's and others to members. Although O'Dwyer has been a critic of PRSA since the 1970s, this is often considered the beginning of a long-term dispute between PRSA and O'Dwyer that PR News described as a "never-ending back-and-forth." In 1996 and 2011, O'Dwyer criticized PRSA on issues such as financial transparency, auditing, and spending in the context of proposed increases in membership dues. PRSA said the increases were caused by an increase in services to members.

In 2000, PRSA and the Institute for Public Relations signed a mutual declaration saying the two would work together in areas like ethics, education, accreditation, professional development, and new media. The society started two efforts to revise its definition of public relations in 2003 and 2007, but neither moved forward. In November 2011, PRSA led a Public Relations Defined initiative to create a crowd-sourced definition of public relations. 927 submissions were made on PRSA's website filling in the blanks to the statement: "Public relations (does what) with or for (whom) to (do what) for (what purpose)." The winning definition was "a strategic communication process that builds mutually beneficial relationships between organizations and their publics." According to the Chartered Institute of Public Relations (CIPR), "reactions to the new PRSA definition were mixed and views vigorously debated."

In 2011, PRSA publicized accusations that O'Dwyer had been eavesdropping on PRSA's conference calls. Later that year PRSA started refusing O'Dwyer entrance to their events and sent him a 23-page letter describing his behavior as disruptive and unethical. The National Press Club tried to negotiate his entrance unsuccessfully.

In 2026, PRSA sent an email to members stating the organization would be taking an "apolitical stance" moving forward, arguing "we do not take positions on... ideological debates unrelated to communication practice." Some members responded negatively.

== Organization ==
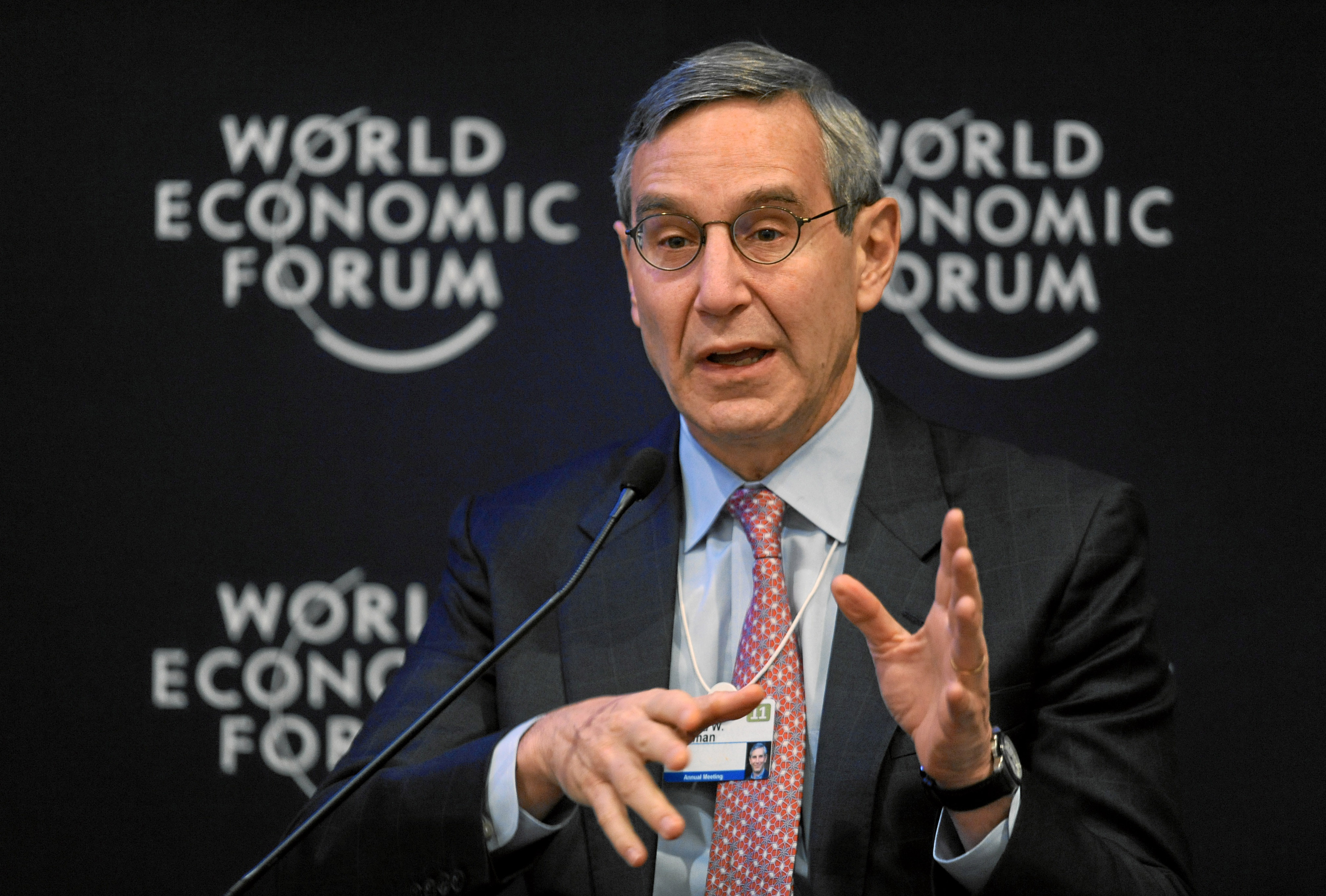
In 2010, Richard Edelman (pictured) and the "Committee for a Democratic PRSA" called for the extension of full voting rights to in the group to members who did not hold the APR designation.

PRSA is organized as a 501(c)(6) not-for-profit organization and governed by a set of bylaws. A chair is nominated each year and elected based on a vote of the Leadership Assembly. The Leadership Assembly consists of one delegate for every 100 members, as well as anyone that holds an elected office. Elected positions within PRSA are held on a volunteer-basis. A board of directors can propose membership fee changes that must be approved by the assembly. The board has the authority to create or dissolve task forces and committees as well as revoke or reward membership status. PRSA's Board of Ethics and Professional Standards and the Universal Accreditation Board make recommendations on the code of conduct and accreditation programs respectively. PRSA has more than 100 chapters in ten districts, nearly 375 student chapters and 14 interest groups. PRSA Miami has the largest endowment of the chapters. The Miami chapter gives a number of awards including a Lifetime Achievement Award and funds scholarships for students in the field of public relations.

Since the 1970s, the PRSA has restricted the right to sit in the group's national assembly or to seek election to the national board to those possessing an APR certification. The requirement for the assembly was dropped in 2004, but was maintained for those seeking board membership. In 2010, a revolt led by Richard Edelman and a group calling itself "the Committee for a Democratic PRSA" called for the restriction to be scrapped. The attempt to overturn the rule was defeated in a vote during that year's session of the assembly. In 2003 a proposal to amend the society's bylaws to allow non-accredited professionals to run for PRSA's offices was defeated, but the motion passed the following year.

== Services ==
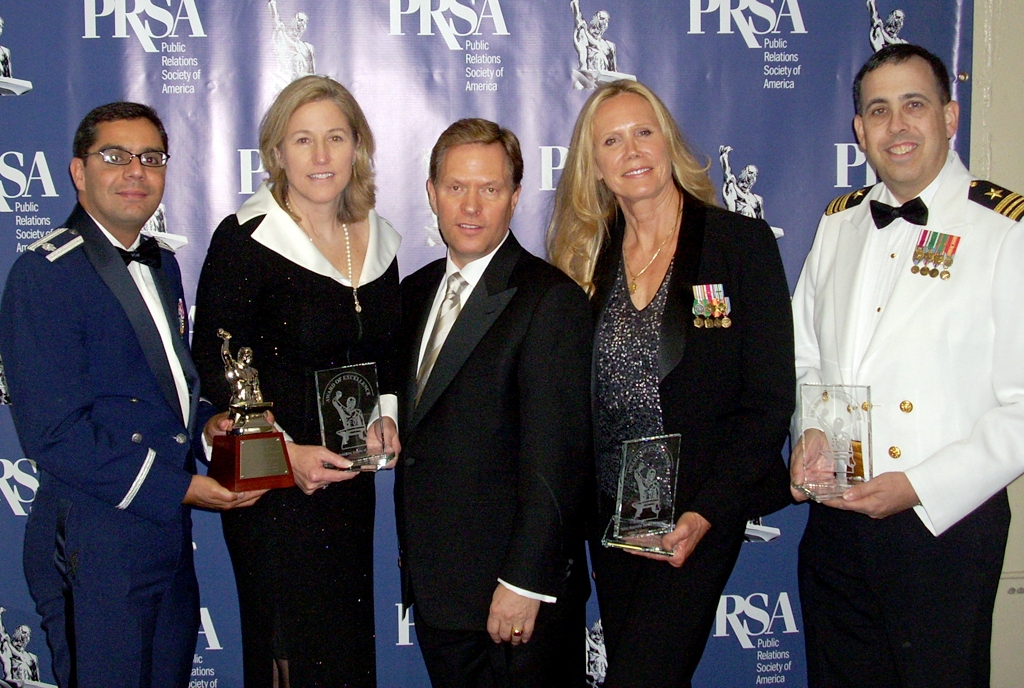
Department of Defense staff holding the Silver Anvil award in 2008

PRSA members receive access to a suite of tools that fosters professional development and career growth. PRSA is a member of the Universal Accreditation Board (UAB) which hosts an accreditation program called APR (accreditation in public relations) that evaluates a PR professional in four categories: research, planning, implementation and evaluation. Accreditation is usually granted to candidates with five to seven years of experience upon completion of written and oral examinations. About 20 percent of PRSA's members are accredited.

PRSA hosts the Anvil Awards, which are issued based on four components: research, planning, execution, and evaluation. The Gold Anvil is awarded to individuals. The Silver Anvil is awarded for strategy and the Bronze for tactics. It also issues awards such as Grand Gold Pick, Rookie of the Year, Lifetime Achievement and PR person of the year.

PRSA's Public Relations Journal was published from October 1945 to 1995. Its original mission statement was "to carry articles that deal with fundamental public relations problems, as they currently press for solution." The journal was comparable to a text-heavy academic periodical. PRSA currently publishes a monthly newspaper, Strategies & Tactics, targeted to communications professionals.

== PRSA code of ethics ==
PRSA publishes a code of ethics that discusses a member's ethical responsibilities to their clients, employers, "the public good," and the industry as a whole. The code was modified in 2000 to focus on education rather enforcement, but all members are required to annually agree to follow the code as part of the membership process. Additionally, the Board of Directors can ban or revoke membership for individuals who have been "sanctioned by a government agency or convicted in a court of law of an action that fails to comply with the Code." PRSA membership is voluntary, however, so practitioners are not subject to the code unless they elect to join the organization.

The code lists the organization's core values of "advocacy," "honesty," "expertise," "independence," "loyalty," and "fairness," along with the PRSA Code Provisions of Conduct regarding the "free flow of information," "competition," "disclosure of information," "safeguarding confidences," "conflicts of interest," and "enhancing the profession." The code expects PRSA members to identify the source of their communications, avoid derogatory methods and avoid abusing insider information. According to the code of conduct, members should "protect and advance the free flow of accurate and truthful information; foster informed decision-making through open communication...and work to strengthen the public's trust in the profession." The code states that members "adhere to the highest standards of accuracy and truth."

The code of ethics was revised in 1954, 1959, 1963, 1977, 1983, 1988 and 2000. The PRSA Board of Ethics and Professional Standards (BEPS) also periodically publishes new Ethical Standards Advisories (ESAs) as new concerns develop. The publications addressed a variety of topics including the use of artificial intelligence.

A story on CBS criticized the code: "Show me a PR person who is 'accurate' and 'truthful,' and I'll show you a PR person who is unemployed."

== Research and advocacy ==
The Public Relations Society of America and the Association for Education in Journalism and Mass Communication commissioned studies in 1975 and 1987 on the state of public relations in education. They found that too many classes were taught by educators with little or no experience in the field and that most needed a post-graduate degree. The studies established Several standards in education, including that 75 percent of coursework for PR professionals be outside the major. In 1991, PRSA hosted a Task Force on the Structure and Role of Public Relations, which found that public relations teachers still needed more practical experience. In 1993, PRSA published a Professional Career Guide, which classified skills and knowledge needed at five different levels of someone's career. PRSA advocates that MBA programs include communications programs so that business executives will be more prepared for a crisis.

PRSA advocates for the trust, credibility and respect of public relations as a profession, believing that PR can facilitate open communication that allows for an informed public and supports the democratic process. In 1999, a National Credibility Index from PRSA found that PR professionals were among the least credible of professions as a spokesperson. The PRSA objected to the actions of the Redner Group in 2011 when the PR firm threatened to blacklist media that gave Duke Nukem negative reviews. In 2012, a Senate subcommittee investigated eleven government agencies' communications and advertising spending. PRSA opposed the investigation, presenting that the effort dismissed the value of public relations in government.

== See also ==
- Canadian Public Relations Society
- Fellow of the PRSA
- Public Relations Journal
- Public Relations Society of India
