= Metropolitan State University =

Public university in Minneapolis–St. Paul, Minnesota, US

Metro State University
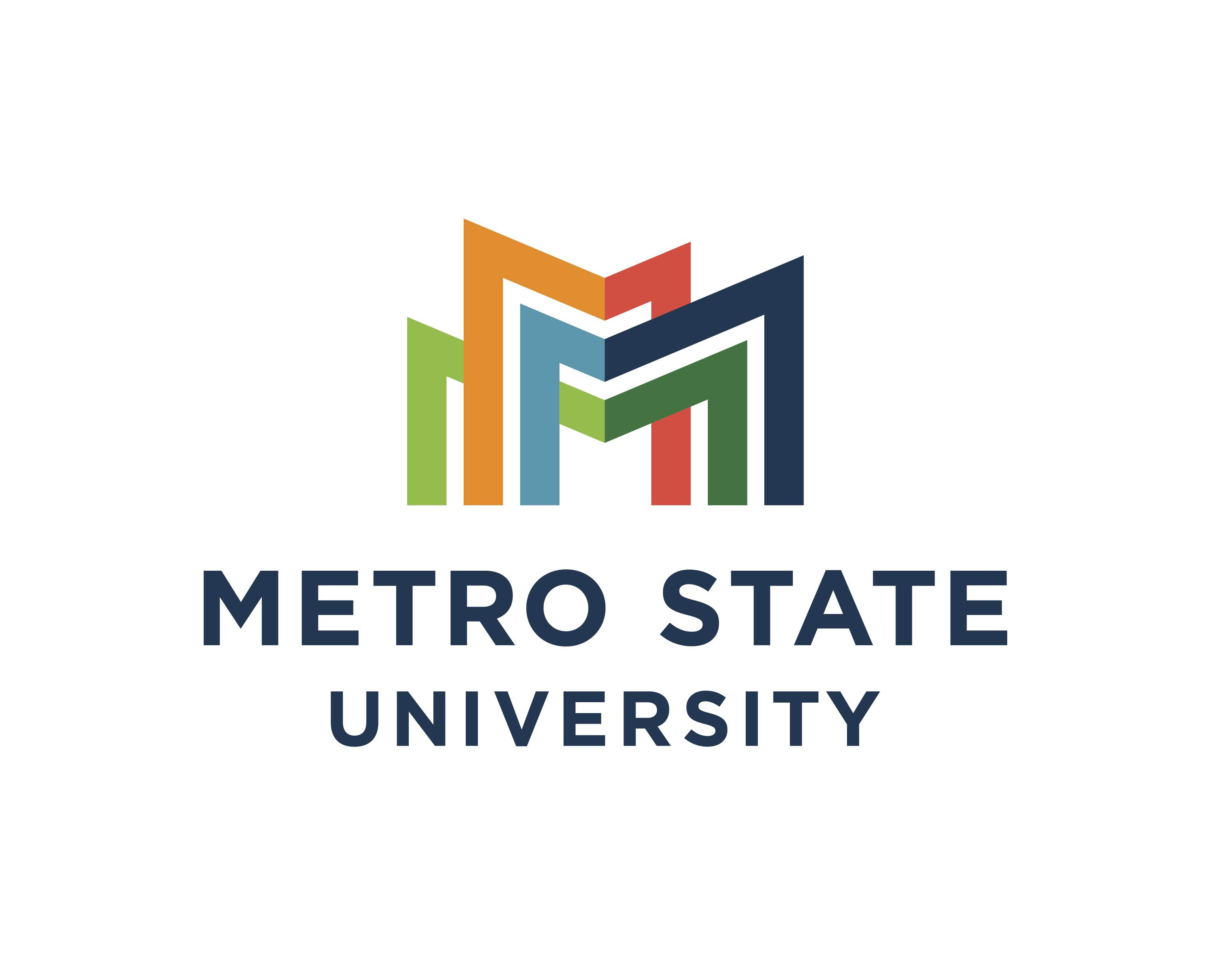
- Motto: Where life and learning meet
- Type: Public university
- Established: 1971; 55 years ago
- Parent institution: Minnesota State System
- Academic affiliations: CUMU
- Endowment: $6.0 million (2019)
- Budget: $108 million (2019)
- President: Ginny Arthur
- Faculty: 750 community faculty 174 resident faculty
- Students: 7861
- Undergraduates: 7031
- Postgraduates: 830
- Location: St. Paul, Minneapolis, and Brooklyn Park, Minnesota, U.S. 44°57′25″N 93°4′26″W
- Campus: Urban
- Website: www.metrostate.edu

Metro State University is a public university in the Minneapolis–St. Paul, Minnesota metropolitan area. It is a member of the Minnesota State Colleges and Universities system.

== History ==
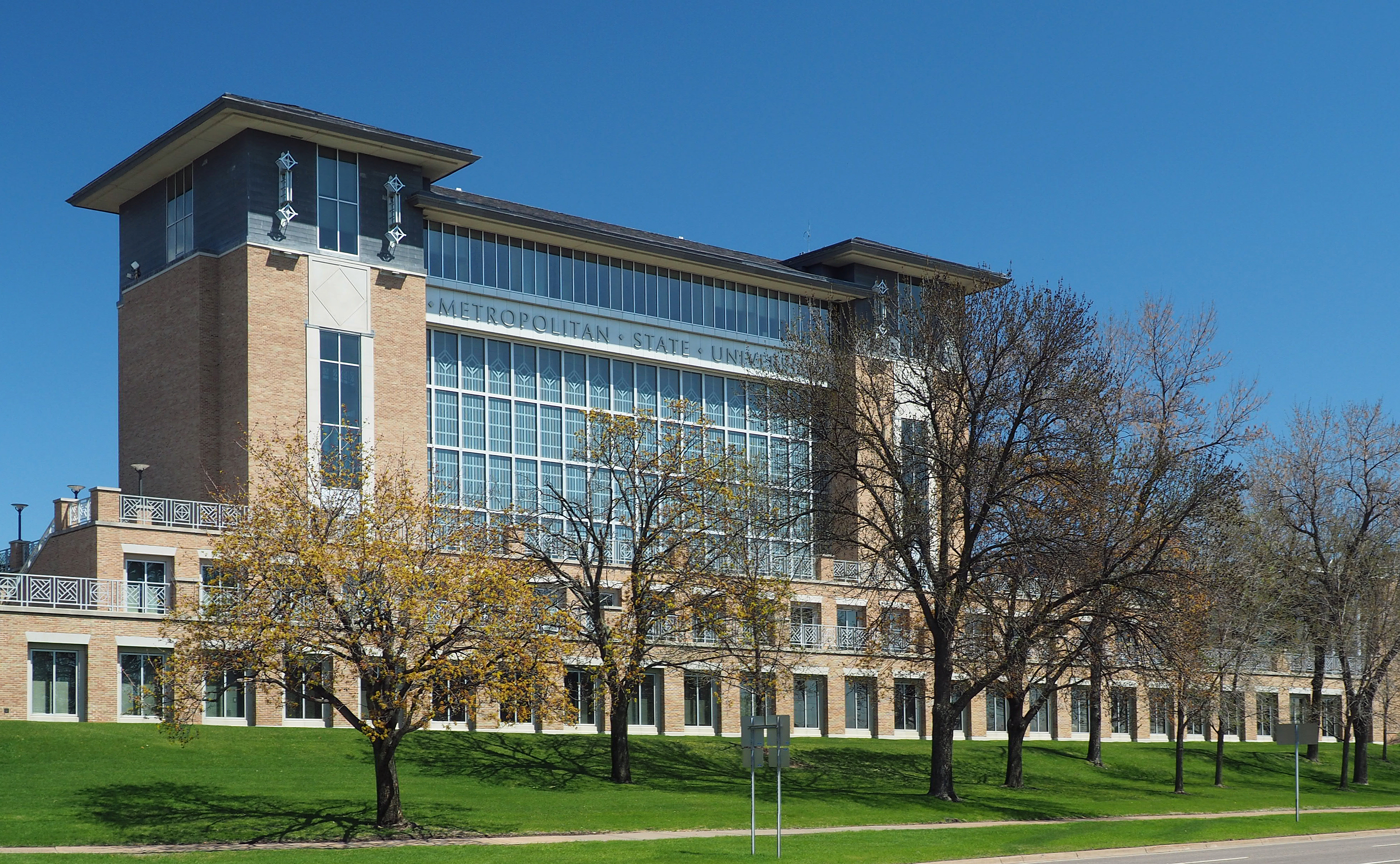
New Main on the Saint Paul campus

The institution was founded in 1971 as Minnesota Metropolitan State College with a mission to educate non-traditional students from the Twin Cities metropolitan area whose needs were not served by other existing institutions. David E. Sweet was appointed the university's first president and the school, with offices above a drugstore in downtown St. Paul, admitted the first class of 50 students in 1972. The university had no campus and held classes in rented space throughout the Twin Cities metropolitan area. When Metropolitan State began, it was a college for working adults. It was strictly an upper-division college where students could complete only their junior and senior years of academic study. The university initially followed a non-traditional course: it offered competence-based learning whereby students were recognized for learning gained outside the classroom—including prior learning through experience. Letter grades were available, but they were always optional. Students designed their own degree plans.

During the 1980s, enrollment grew from around 1,000 students to over 2,500. The university expanded its programs to 30 baccalaureate programs as the state increased funding for the institution.

The university began admitting freshmen and sophomores and adopted general education requirements and a grading policy with grade point averages in 1994. In 1992, the main campus moved to the Dayton's Bluff section of east Saint Paul. The university maintained a commitment to offering classes in spaces throughout the metropolitan area. Today the main campus is in Saint Paul, and additional campus facilities are in Midway, Minneapolis, and Brooklyn Park.

During the 2009–2010 school year, Metro State enrolled 6,000 full-time equivalent students. From 2008 to June 30, 2014, Sue K. Hammersmith was Metro State's president. During Hammersmith's six-year tenure, the number of degrees conferred increased by 38%. Devinder Malhotra became Metro State's president on July 1, 2014. During the 2014–2015 school year, Metro State served 12,000 full and part-time students. Virginia Arthur was Metro State's provost from 2012 until 2016, when she became the university's president.

=== Presidents ===
- David E. Sweet (1972–1977)
- Reatha King (1977–1988)
- Charles Graham (1988–1989)
- Tobin Barrozo (1989–1992)
- Richard Green (1993–1993)
- Susan Cole (1993–1998)
- Dennis Nielsen (1998–2000)
- Wilson G. Bradshaw (2000–2007)
- William Lowe (2007–2008)
- Sue Hammersmith (2008–2014)
- Devinder Malhotra (2014–2016)
- Virginia Arthur (2016–present)

== Academics ==
As part of its mission to educate working adults and non-traditional students, Metro State previously had an open admissions policy with rolling applications accepted throughout the year. According to U.S. News & World Report's 2022 "Best Colleges" ranking guide, Metro State University is a 'national university' with a 56% acceptance rate.

Metro State offers 62 undergraduate degree programs, a self-designed B.A. degree in liberal arts, a self-designed/individualized B.A. degree, and three undergraduate certificates through its four colleges and three schools: the College of Arts and Sciences, the College of Management, the College of Health, Community and Professional Studies, the School of Nursing, the School of Law Enforcement and Criminal Justice, the School of Urban Education and the College of Individualized Studies.

Metro State University offers 25 master's degree programs, an MA or MS degree in individualized studies, and an interdisciplinary Master of Arts degree in liberal studies. The university also offers eleven graduate certificate programs. In 2007, Metro State began offering an applied doctor of nursing practice degree. Metro State launched the first applied doctorate in business administration within the Minnesota State system during fall semester 2010. The Bachelor of Science in Accounting program is the largest in Minnesota. Moreover, graduates of Metro State's accounting program consistently place among the top-10 finishers in Minnesota's exacting CPA examination. Altogether, Metro State offers a total of 108 undergraduate and graduate academic degrees and certificates—this does not include any undergraduate minor programs.

The university is accredited by the Higher Learning Commission with specific programs accredited by relevant discipline-specific accreditors such as the Accreditation Council for Business Schools and Programs (ACBSP), Commission on Collegiate Nursing Education (CCNE) and Council on Social Work Education (CSWE). Metro State is also accredited by the Minnesota Professional Educator Licensing and Standards Board (PELSB), the Minnesota Board of Peace Officer Standards and Training (POST), and the Society for Human Resource Management (SHRM). In addition, Metro State has received recognition and endorsements from the Institute of Management Accountants (IMA) and from the National Center of Academic Excellence in Cyber Defense Education.

== Student demographics ==
Undergraduate demographics as of Fall 2023
Race and ethnicity	Total
White	36%
Black	32%
Asian	17%
Hispanic	8%
Two or more races	4%
International student	2%
American Indian/Alaska Native	1%
Unknown	1%
Economic diversity
Pell Grant recipients	47%

Based on data from the 2016–2017 academic year, 45% of Metro State University's student body were students of color, while 4% were from out of state and 2% were international. 42% of students were male and 58% were female. Students ranged in age from 15 to 84. The Class of 2015 had an 82% licensure exam pass rate. Metro State has a 67% six-year graduation rate.

== Student accommodations ==
Metro State University accommodates the needs of working adults by scheduling many of its classes in the evening and on weekends. It is possible for recent graduates of Minneapolis and St. Paul public high schools to attend Metro State tuition-free.

== Library ==
In 2002, the Minnesota legislature approved funding for the construction of a library at the St. Paul campus; the building opened in 2004. The library also houses a branch of the Saint Paul Public Library. This is Minnesota's only university/public library partnership and one of only a few nationwide.

To encourage the spiritual development of students and members of the community, the library built the David Barton Community Labyrinth and Reflective Garden, named in honor of the library's first dean. The labyrinth is open to the public and has been the setting for several events.

== Notable alumni ==
Metro State's first graduating class consisted of 12 people on February 1, 1973. As of May 4, 2026, Metro State has 58,033 alumni. Notable alumni include:

- Néstor Amarilla - playwright
- Derek Chauvin - police officer who murdered George Floyd
- Carl Eller - professional football player
- Leo Foley - politician
- Frank J. Grass - United States Army general and chief of the National Guard Bureau
- Ken Kelash - politician
- John Kriesel - politician
- James Lukaszewski - business executive
- Mohamud Noor - computer scientist, activist, and politician
- Ade A. Olufeko - technologist and entrepreneur
- Sandy Pappas - politician
- Samuel Sam-Sumana - politician
- Char Samuelson - politician
- Ben Schierer - politician
- Don Shelby - news anchor

== See also ==
- List of colleges and universities in Minnesota
- Higher education in Minnesota
