= Institute for Public Relations =

- Predecessor: Foundations for Public Relations Research and Education
- Key people: Dr. Tina McCorkindale (President and CEO)
- Website: instituteforpr.org

The Institute for Public Relations (IPR) is a United States-based, non-profit organization that organizes and sponsors research on public relations.

The IPR traces its origins to the 1956 establishment of the Foundations for Public Relations Research and Education, a program of the Public Relations Society of America (PRSA). Pendleton Dudley was the inaugural chair of the early group which became an independent organization, adopting the name "institute", in 1989. In 2016, the PRSA announced a three-year program of partnership with the IPR to "examine gaps in expectations and skills for new professionals, while also informing the industry at large on how to support its up-and-coming talent base".

The Institute for Public Relations is housed at Weimer Hall on the campus of the University of Florida in Gainesville, Florida.
