= Richard Edelman =

American businessman (born 1954)

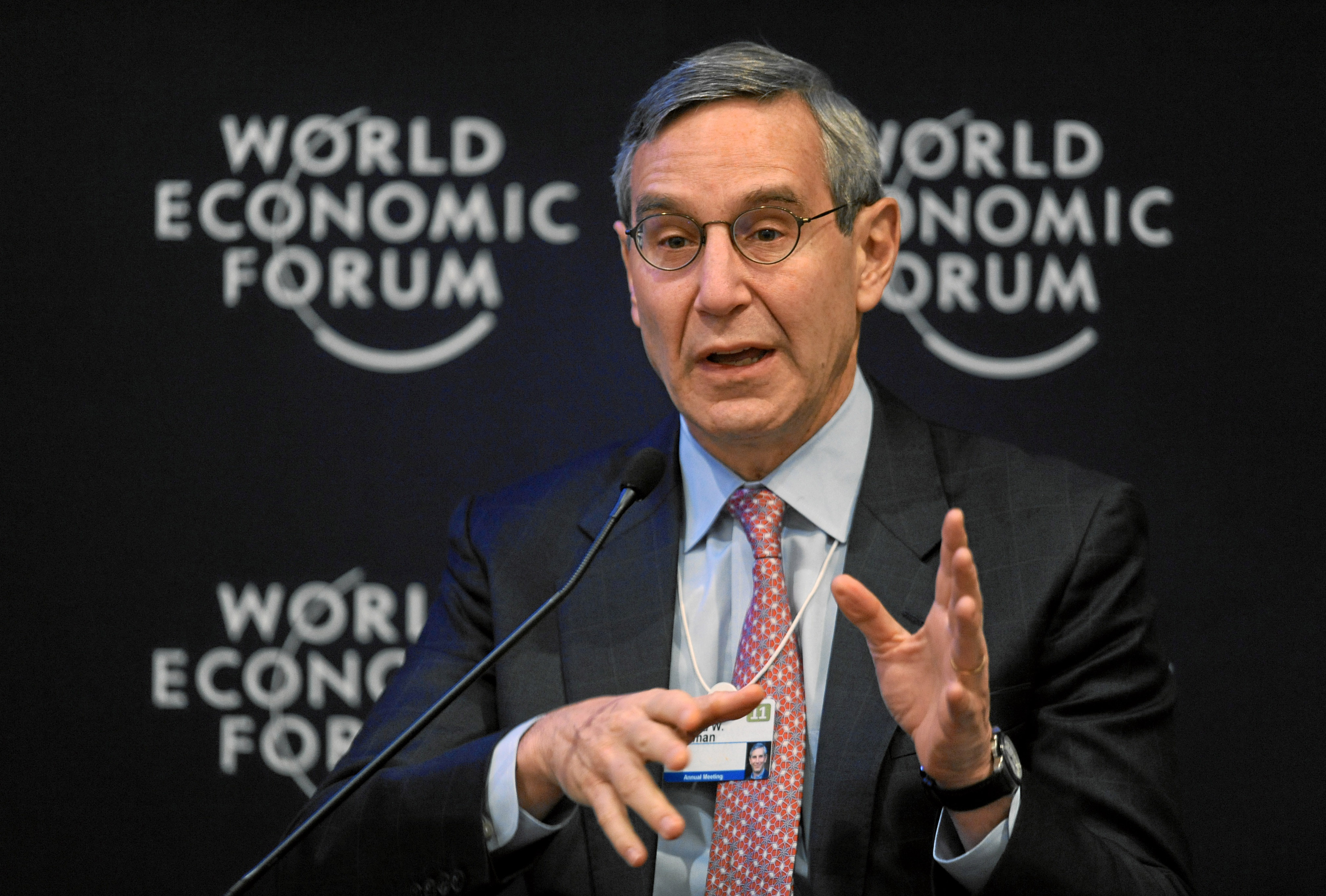
- Edelman in 2011
- Born: Richard Winston Edelman; June 1954 (age 72); Chicago, Illinois, U.S.
- Education: Phillips Exeter Academy; Harvard University (AB); Harvard Business School (MBA)
- Title: President and CEO, Edelman
- Term: 1996–
- Spouses: Rosalind Anne Walrath (m. 1986; div. 2015) Claudia Romo González (m. 2017)
- Children: 3
- Parent(s): Daniel Edelman; Ruth Ann Rozumoff
- Website: Richard Edelman

Richard Winston Edelman (born June 1954) is an American businessman, who became the president and chief executive officer of public relations company Edelman, founded by his father, in 1996.

== Personal life ==
Edelman was born in June 1954, to a Jewish family, the son of Ruth Ann (née Rozumoff) and Daniel Edelman, the founder of the public relations company, Edelman. He was educated at Phillips Exeter Academy.

On May 18, 1986, he married Rosalind Anne Walrath in a Jewish ceremony at the Harvard Club of New York City. His wife is the daughter of the then-creative director of advertising agency JWT, and was a vice president at the investment bank Keefe, Bruyette & Woods when they wed. He has three daughters, Margot, Tory, and Amanda. In 2008, he was diagnosed with prostate cancer, and had successful surgery. In 2015, it was announced that Edelman and Walrath were getting divorced. In 2017, Edelman married Mexican public servant Claudia Romo González, and the couple lives in Manhattan. Claudia had two children, Joshua and Tamara, in her previous marriage.

His two siblings, John and Renee, are also executives at Edelman, making Edelman the largest private, family-run public relations firm in the world. His daughters, Margot and Tory, both work for the firm.

== Career ==
Richard Edelman joined the Edelman firm in 1978 after receiving his MBA from Harvard, where he had also studied as an undergraduate. He had intended to take a job in marketing at Playtex, but his father persuaded him to join the family business. He was an executive at Edelman by 1981 and in 1983, was appointed president of Edelman's New York office. Edelman was appointed president of the company in 1985, and his father remained as chief executive officer. At that time, the company's income was only $14.2 million. He pledged to keep the company independent at a time when many other PR companies were being bought by advertising agencies. Edelman later became the regional manager of Europe before being promoted to chief executive officer in September 1996, a post he still holds. He created the Edelman Trust Barometer, which measures public trust in key institutions.

Edelman is a regular attendee at the World Economic Forum's annual meeting in Davos, having been nine times by 2007. In a 2012 presentation, his main message was that, based on a survey by his company, the public do not trust governments and business executives anymore.

In 2026, Edelman said that artificial intelligence would make public relations even more important, with news coverage influencing large language models and the perceived credibility of influencers.

== Social media ==
Edelman was one of the first PR practitioners to identify the importance of social media and create a specialist practice. He coined the phrase circle of cross influence to describe how people are increasingly influenced by other people, the internet, new media and cable TV, rather than mainstream media. He has written a blog since 2004, and is one of the first chief executive officers to do so. In 2007, PRWeek described his blog as one of the better-known PR blogs, in part due to some of his posts being controversial.

He has advised the Canadian tar sands industry how to counter negative PR from NGOs using social media.

== Appointments ==
Edelman is a member of the board of directors of the Ad Council and the Atlantic Council. Edelman sits on the board of the Children's Aid Society, the International Business Leaders Forum, the Gettysburg National Battlefield Foundation and the National Committee on United States-China Relations. He is a member of the World Economic Forum, the Arthur Page Society, the PR Seminar and a director of the Jerusalem Foundation. In 2009 Edelman was appointed executive jury chair of a new award recognizing the creative use of unpaid publicity, given at the Clio Awards.

== Awards ==
In September 2014, Edelman was inducted into the Arthur W. Page Society Hall of Fame. In March 2019, he was named "Agency Pro of the Last 20 Year." by PRWeek.

== Views ==
Shortly after the 2008 mortgage lending crisis, Edelman said that financial institutions have a PR problem. He claimed that financial institutions rank lowest on in terms of public trust, because they don't explain the how and why of their actions to the public. Edelman spends about an hour per day voicing his views on the company blog that he started to set an example for his clients.

Edelman has helped raise donations for the Vietnam Veterans Memorial. In 2022, Edelman was among those sanctioned by the Russian Government in retaliation for U.S. sanctions in response to the Russian invasion of Ukraine.
