= Daniel Edelman (businessman) =

American public relations executive

- Born: July 3, 1920; New York City, U.S.
- Died: January 15, 2013 (aged 92); Chicago, Illinois, U.S.
- Education: Columbia University
- Known for: Founder, Edelman
- Spouse: Ruth Ann Rozumoff
- Children: Richard Edelman

Daniel Joseph Edelman (July 3, 1920 – January 15, 2013) was an American public relations executive who founded the world's largest public relations firm, Edelman. Edelman had a significant influence on the methodology of public relations.

== Life and career ==
Edelman was born to a Jewish family in Manhattan. He attended DeWitt Clinton High School in the Bronx. He then attended Columbia University, graduating from Columbia College in 1940, then earning a master's degree in journalism in 1941 from Columbia University Graduate School of Journalism.

His first job was working as a sports reporter in Poughkeepsie, New York. After serving in a United States Army psychological warfare unit during World War II, he was a night news reporter at CBS before taking work promoting jazz artists.

In 1947, Edelman moved to Chicago as public relations director for haircare product line Toni Home Permanent Co (now a division of Gillette). In 1952, he founded Edelman there. His son Richard Edelman became president & chief executive officer in 1985.

Edelman died of congestive heart failure in Chicago.
