= Contingency theory of accommodation =

Theory in public relations

The contingency theory of accommodation was proposed in 1997 by Amanda Cancel, Glen Cameron, Lynne Sallot and Michel Mitrook to highlight the pertinent factors of how a public relations practitioner facilitates communication between the organization and its external publics.

As an alternative to the theory of excellence in public relations developed by James Grunig based on the 2-way symmetrical communication model in public relations, the contingency theory provides an alternative to the highly normative nature of the excellence theory in public relations.

The contingency theory is concerned about "what is going to be the most effective method at a given time" by considering the various contingent factors in the strategies organizations use when dealing with their external publics (p. 35). Opposed to the normative nature of the excellence theory, the contingency approach posits that "true" excellence should instead facilitate public relations to pick the most appropriate strategies which best meet the current need of the organization and its publics at any given point in time, and that antecedent, mediating, and moderating variables may inevitably lead to greater or lesser accommodation during organizational-public communication.

== The advocacy-accommodation continuum ==
The contingency theory considers arguments from game theory that perfect 2- way symmetrical communication will never end with satisfactory solution for both parties who are trying to please the other side, and proposed instead two-way communication as a continuum between pure advocacy and accommodation. In this view, organizational communication strategies both internally and externally should be measured more by an infinite number of points than an "either-or" picture might suggest, providing a more accurate representation of the fluidity of organizational stances and decisions on public relations strategies made over time. The various factors proposed in the theory thus aim to make it possible for both public relations practitioners and scholars to identify what makes the most appropriate approach for organizational-publics communication at any point in time within the continuum between pure advocacy and pure accommodation.

The theory of contingency is premised on the different possibilities for organizational communication at any point within the advocacy-accommodation continuum. This view of communication approach based on a continuum differs from the view proposed by the more traditional Four models of public relations communication. On one end of the continuum, advocacy defines the role of public relations practitioners like those of an attorney representing their clients' side of the issue. Similarly, to plead ethically and effectively towards a cause of an organization is an intrinsic function of public relations practitioners as advocators and defenders of organizations. Pure advocacy of organizational interests on the other hand portrays a negative image associated with persuasion, manipulation and mistrust which threatens the organization's ability to foster and maintain relationships with its publics. The theory of contingency thus suggests that any organizational-publics communication should at any point in time be focused instead on consensus-building at a suitable point along the advocacy-accommodation continuum.

The contingency theory thus forwarded an extensive list of 87 variables which affects the different public relations stances taken between pure advocacy and accommodation when organizations deal with their external publics. These variables are divided into two categories based on its external and internal environment. The variables in the external category are sub-divided into five different sets of variables; i) threats; ii) industry environment; iii) general political, social environment, and external culture; iv) characteristics of the external public; and v) the issue under question. The internal variables on the hand can be sub-divided into six sets of variables; i) characteristics of the organization; ii) characteristics of the public relations department; iii) characteristics of top management (dominant coalition); iv) internal threats; v) the individual characteristics of the public relations practitioner, managers; and vi) characteristics of organization-public relationships. Adapted from the seminal work on contingency theory, the table below shows the different variables and their corresponding categories.

== Contingency variables ==
External Environment factors

Threats	Industry environment	General political, social environment, and culture	Characteristics of the external public	Issue under question
Litigation, Government regulation, Potentially damaging publicity, Scarring of company's reputation in business community and in the general public, Legitimizing activists' claims	Dynamic or static, Number of competitors/level of competition, Richness or leanness of resources in the environment	Degree of political support of business, Degree of social support of business	Size and/or number of members, Degree of source credibility/powerful members or connections, Past successes or failures of groups to evoke change, Amount of advocacy practiced by organization, Level of commitment/involvement of members, Whether the group has public relations counsellors or not, Public's perception of group: reasonable or radical, Level of media coverage the public has received in past, Whether representatives of the public know or like representatives of the organization, Whether representatives of the organization know or like representatives from the public, Public's willingness to dilute its cause/request/claim, Moves and countermoves, Relative power of organization, Relative power of public	Size, Stakes, Complexity

Internal Environment factors

Characteristics of organization	Characteristics of the public relations department	Characteristics of top management	Internal threats	Individual characteristics of PR practitioner, managers	Characteristics of organization-public relationships
Open or closed culture, Dispersed widely geographically or centralized, Level of technology the corporation uses to produce its product or service/complexity of products and/or services, Homogeneity or heterogeneity of employees, Age of the corporation/value placed on tradition, Speed of growth in the knowledge level the corporation uses, Economic stability of the organization, Existence or nonexistence of issues management personnel or program, Corporation's past experiences with conflicting outside organizations: positive or negative, Distribution of decision-making power, Formalization: Number of rules or codes defining and limiting the job descriptions of employees, Stratification/hierarchy of positions, Existence or influence of corporation legal department, Business exposure, Corporate culture,	Total number of practitioners and number with college degrees, Type of past training of employees, Location of public relations department in corporate hierarchy, Representation in the dominant coalition, Experience level of public relations practitioners in dealing with conflict, General communication competency of department, Autonomy of department, Physical placement of department in corporate building, Staff trained in research methods, Amount of funding available for dealing with external publics, Amount of time allowed to use dealing with external publics, Gender population of staff, Potential of department to practice various models of public relations	Political values: conservative or liberal/open or closed to change, Management style: domineering or laid back, General altruism level, Support and understanding of public relations	Economic considerations (potential loss vs. potential gain from implementing various strategies), Marring of employees' or stockholders' perception of the company, Marring of the personal reputations of the company decision makers	Professional training in public relations, marketing, journalism, engineering, and so on, Personal ethics, Tolerance or ability to deal with uncertainty, Comfort level with conflict or dissonance, Comfort level with change, Ability to recognize potential and existing problems, Extent to which their perception of reality is open to innovation, Extent to which they can grasp others' worldviews, Personality, Communication competency, Cognitive complexity, Predisposition toward negotiation, Predisposition toward altruism, How they receive, process, and use information and influence, Whether they know or are familiar with external public or their representative, Whether they like external public or their representative, Gender	Level of trust between organization and external public, Dependency of parties involved, Ideological barriers between organization and public

== See also ==
- Index of public relations-related articles
- Edward Bernays & Propaganda in Public Relations
