= Public =

Grouping of individual people

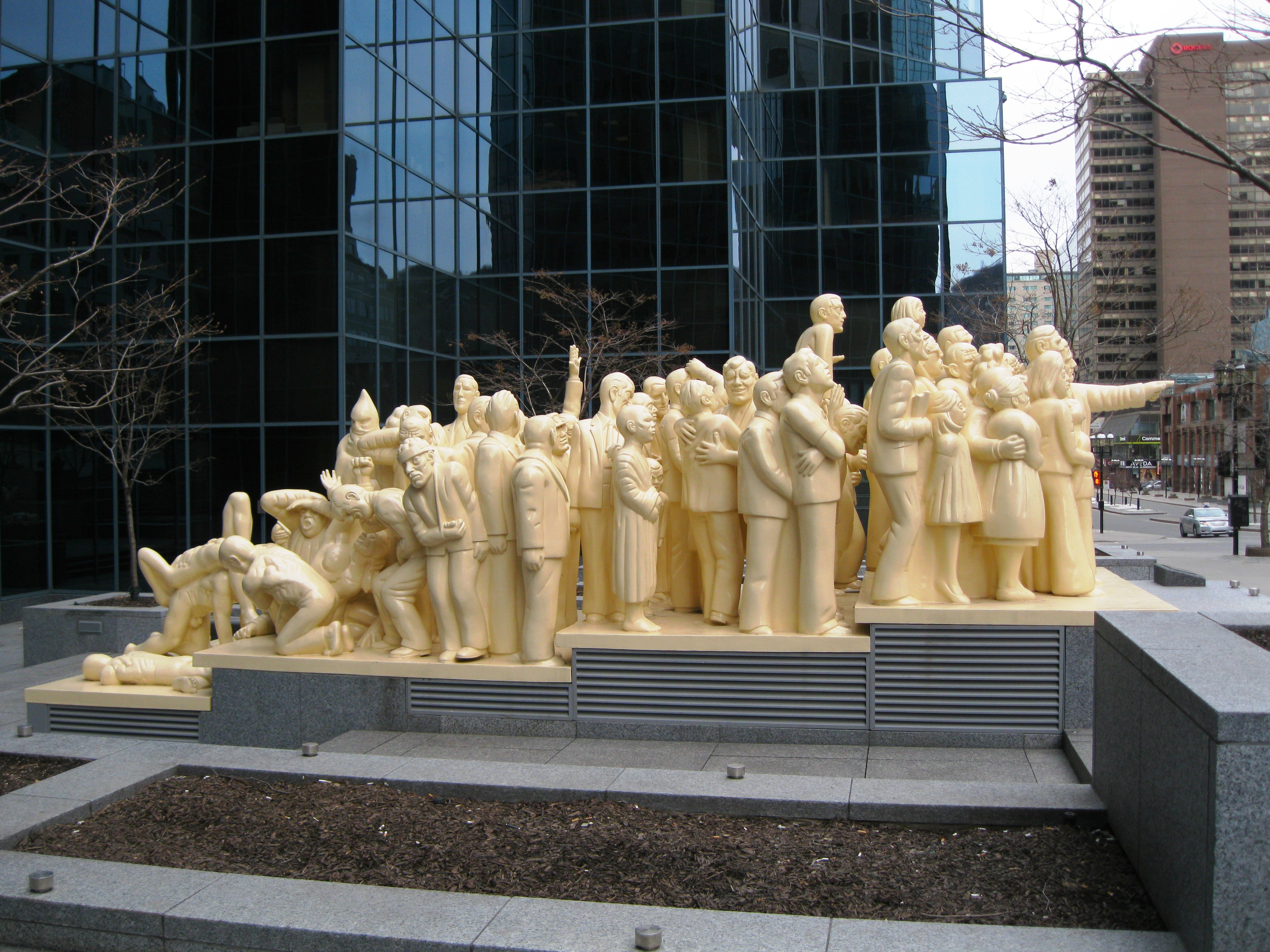
The diverse public is symbolized in this sculpture situated in Montreal, Canada, named "La Foule illuminée".

In public relations and communication science, publics are groups of individual people, and the public (a.k.a. the general public) is the totality of such groupings. This is a different concept to the sociological concept of the Öffentlichkeit or public sphere.

The concept of a public has also been defined in political science, psychology, marketing, and advertising. In public relations and communication science, it is one of the more ambiguous concepts in the field.

Although it has definitions in the theory of the field that have been formulated from the early 20th century onward, in more recent years it has suffered from being blurred, as a result of conflation of the idea of a public with the notions of audience, market segment, community, constituency, and stakeholder.

== Etymology and definitions ==
The name "public" originates with the Latin publicus (also poplicus), from populus, to the English word 'populace', and in general denotes some mass population ("the people") in association with some matter of common interest. So in political science and history, a public is a population of individuals in association with civic affairs, or affairs of office or state. In social psychology, marketing, and public relations, a public has a more situational definition. John Dewey defined (Dewey 1927) public as a group of people who, in facing a similar problem, recognize it and organize themselves to address it. Dewey's definition of a public is thus situational: people organized about a situation. Built upon this situational definition of a public is the situational theory of publics by James E. Grunig (Grunig 1983), which talks of nonpublics (who have no problem), latent publics (who have a problem), aware publics (who recognize that they have a problem), and active publics (who do something about their problem).

In public relations and communication theory, a public is distinct from a stakeholder or a market. A public is a subset of the set of stakeholders for an organization, that comprises those people concerned with a specific issue. Whilst a market has an exchange relationship with an organization, and is usually a passive entity that is created by the organization, public does not necessarily have an exchange relationship, and is both self-creating and self-organizing. Publics are targeted by public relations efforts. In this, target publics are those publics whose involvement is necessary for achieving organization goals; intervening publics are opinion formers and mediators, who pass information to the target publics; and influentials are publics that the target publics turn to for consultation, whose value judgements are influential upon how a target public will judge any public relations material. The public is often targeted especially in regard to political agendas as their vote is necessary in order to further the progression of the cause. As seen in Massachusetts between 2003 and 2004, it was necessary to "win a critical mass of states and a critical mass of public support" in order to get same-sex marriage passed in the commonwealth.

Public relations theory perspectives on publics are situational, per Dewey and Grunig; mass, where a public is simply viewed as a population of individuals; agenda-building, where a public is viewed as a condition of political involvement that is not transitory; and "homo narrans", where a public is (in the words of Gabriel M. Vasquez, assistant professor in the School of Communication at the University of Houston) a collection of "individuals that develop a group consciousness around a problematic situation and act to solve the problematic situations" (Vasquez 1993, pp. 209). Public schools are often under controversy for their "agenda-building," especially in debates over whether to teach a religious or secular curriculum. The promotion of an agenda is commonplace whenever one is in a public environment, but schools have exceptional power in that regard.

One non-situational concept of a public is that of Kirk Hallahan, professor at Colorado State University, who defines a public as "a group of people who relate to an organization, who demonstrate varying degrees of activity—passivity, and who might (or might not) interact with others concerning their relationship with the organization".

Samuel Mateus's 2011 paper "Public as Social Experience" considered to view the concept by an alternative point of view: the public "is neither a simple audience constituted by media consumers nor just a rational-critical agency of a Public Sphere". He argued "the concept should also be seen in the light of a publicness principle, beyond a critic and manipulative publicity (...). In accordance, the public may be regarded as the result of the social activities made by individuals sharing symbolic representations and common emotions in publicness. Seen with lower-case, the concept is a set of subjectivities who look publicly for a feeling of belonging. So, in this perspective, the public is still a fundamental notion to social life although in a different manner in comparison to 18th century Public Sphere's Public. He means above all the social textures and configurations where successive layers of social experience are built up."

== Social publics ==
Social publics are groups of people united by common ideas, ideology, or hobbies. Networked publics are social publics which have been socially restructured by the networking of technologies. As such, they are simultaneously both (1) the space constructed through networked technologies and (2) the imagined collective which consequently emerges as a result of the intersection of human persons, shared technologies, and their practices.

== See also ==
- Community
- Nation
- People
- Public sphere
- Res publica
- Volk
