= Excellence theory =

General theory of public relations

The Excellence theory is a general theory of public relations that “specifies how public relations makes organizations more effective, how it is organized and managed when it contributes most to organizational effectiveness, the conditions in organizations and their environments that make organizations more effective, and how the monetary value of public relations can be determined”. The excellence theory resulted from a study about the best practice in public relations, which was headed by James E. Grunig and funded by the Foundation of the International Association of Business Communicators (IABC) in 1985. Constructed upon a number of middle-range theories, and tested with surveys and interviews of professionals and CEOs in the United States, the United Kingdom, Canada, and South Korea, the Excellence theory provides a “theoretical and empirical benchmark” for public relations units.

== Overview ==
The Excellence Theory explained that the value of public relations lies in organization-public relations. Good relationship with its strategic publics is helpful for an organization to develop and achieve goals desired by both the organization and its publics, reduce costs of negative publicity, and increase revenue by providing products and services needed by stakeholders. To maximize value of public relations, public relations must identify strategic publics and build long-term relationships with them through symmetrical communication programs. The excellence theory also shows that an organization's reputation is largely a byproduct of these organizational behaviors and organization-public relationships, reemphasizing the important strategic role that public relations has in organizational governance.

The Excellence study identified characteristics of effective public relations in four major categories:

1. Empowerment of public relations function: effective organization must empower public relations as a critical management function
2. Communicator roles: let public relations executives play managerial role as well as administrative role
3. Organization of communication function: public relations should be an integrated communication function and separate from instead of being sublimated to marketing or other management functions
4. Public relations models: effect organization should base its internal and external communication and relationship building on two-way symmetrical model.

== Historical Development ==
The excellence theory evolved from four approaches: goal attainment, systems, strategic constituencies, and competing values, with the competing values approach bridging the gap between strategic constituencies and organization's goals by stating that an organization must integrate strategic constituencies’ values with its goals so that the organization attains the goals of most value to its strategic constituencies.

=== Goal Attainment ===
The goal-attainment approach states that organizations are effective when they meet their goals. In 1952, Cutlip and Center first described the concept of public relations management. In 1954, Drucker proposed management by objectives approach, which warned that managers might get involved in day-to-day activities and forget their main objectives, and suggested that everybody within an organization should have a clear understanding of the organization's aims, and awareness of their own roles and responsibilities in achieving those aims.

=== Systems ===
The systems approach here recognizes the importance of environment for an organization to be effective by indicating mutual need between an organization and its environment. According to the open system theory proposed by von Bertalanffy, a system is a complex of interacting elements, and “a system is ...open if there is import and export, and therefore, change of the components” (p. 23). Similarly, organizations are linked with resources in their external environment, and in the meantime, external environment needs products and services from the organizations.

=== Strategic Constituencies ===
The strategic constituencies approach identifies the elements of the environment whose opposition or support can threaten the organization's goals or help to attain them. It based on Grunig's situational theory of publics and multi-systems theory of organizational communication. The situational theory postulates that people can be identified and classified according to their problem awareness and information seeking behavior in problems solution process. The situational theory provided a means to segment stakeholders as nonpublic, latent public, aware public, and active public according to their relationship and response to a problem. The multi-systems theory of organization communication explains that it is important for organizations to deal with communication at various system levels, including employee subsystems, consumer system, intersystem relations between employees and a clientele, public relations communications of the total organization, and inter-organizational communication.

=== Competing Values ===
Organizational literature shows that organizational effectiveness can be sorted according to criteria of competing values model:

1. Stability vs. Flexibility: represents debating viewpoints in order, control, authority, versus diversity, individual initiative, and organizational adaptability.
2. Internal vs. External: refers to conflict between emphasis on well-being of people in an organization and emphasis on development of the organization itself.
3. Means vs. Ends: emphasis on process like planning and goal setting.

== Extension ==
=== Global Theory of Public Relations ===
During the last decade, scholars have replicated the excellence study around the world. Results from these studies extended the Excellence theory into a global public relations theory, which provides generic principles that are understood in the same way around the world and can be operated effectively in most nations. The global public relations theory also suggests that practice in different countries should be different based on culture, the political or economic system, media system, level of economic development, and extent and nature of activism in a certain country.

For example, Rhee (2002) conducted a cross-cultural study of the excellence theory in South Korea, finding that the theory could be used to explain South Korean public relations practice. Rhee's study surveyed public relations practitioners in three types of organizations located in Seoul, the capital of South Korea, using subsets of the original excellence questionnaire and questions to measure the dimensions of culture. All principles examined in Rhee's study—dimensions of communication, knowledge potential for public relations, participant in strategic management, support for public relations, and value of public relations—were consistent with the excellence theory and also showed the validity of the theory as it relates to the cultural context of Korea. However, Rhee noted in the study that cross-cultural replication of this study is necessary to explore and further develop a global public relations theory.

=== Personal Influence Model ===
The Personal influence model is developed by Sriramesh, which described practitioners building personal influence with key individuals like government regulators, media, and tax officials by doing favor for them so that they could solicit favors in return when the organizations need help. Sriramesh noted that this model plays a dominant role in many developing countries. Therefore, this model is known as the non-Western model.

=== Public Relations Scales ===
After reviewing the development and criticisms of the excellence theory, Laskin (2012) proposed ways to modify the public relations models proposed in the excellence theory and translate them into new and improved dimensions of five continuous and measurable scales. Laskin's study proposes the construction of these five scales—the direction of communication scale, intended beneficiary scale, strategic nature scale, role scale, and timeframe scale—that would be able to measure concepts of communication and balance of intended effects. However, Laskin says this instrument does not have to be limited to just these five scales and that one should be able to add or drop scales to better capture the peculiarities of a specific campaign, organization, or industry.

== Criticism ==
Many scholars have questioned the possibility of the two-way symmetrical model in real-life context. Van der Meiden observed that the two-way symmetrical model is unrealistic since it suggests that organizations should value the interests of their publics more than those of the organization. Murphy proposed that the concept of symmetrical communication works along a continuum from pure conflict to pure cooperation, which is based on mixed motives. Leichty argued that completely collaborative public relations is not feasible in some situations, and pointed out that public relations practitioners’ lack of power within an organization further increases the limitation of collaboration. Cameron and his colleagues developed the contingency theory of accommodation, which represent the stance movement of an organization toward a given public at a given time and in a given situation and suggests that the true excellence in public relations may result from picking the appropriate point along the continuum that best fits the current need of the organization and its publics. Researchers have also found that excellence theory may underpin and perpetuate inequalities of power by imposing a monocultural and normative management model, which can devalue national traditions, minorities and cultural differences, and subject the wellbeing of society to corporate profitability.
