= Publix (disambiguation) =

Publix is a supermarket chain based in Lakeland, Florida.

Publix may refer to:

- Publix Theatres, the name of the movie theater chain once owned by Paramount Pictures
- Publix Theatre, former theatre building in Boston, Massachusetts

== See also ==
- Publics
