= Sonia Livingstone =

British social psychologist

Sonia Livingstone OBE
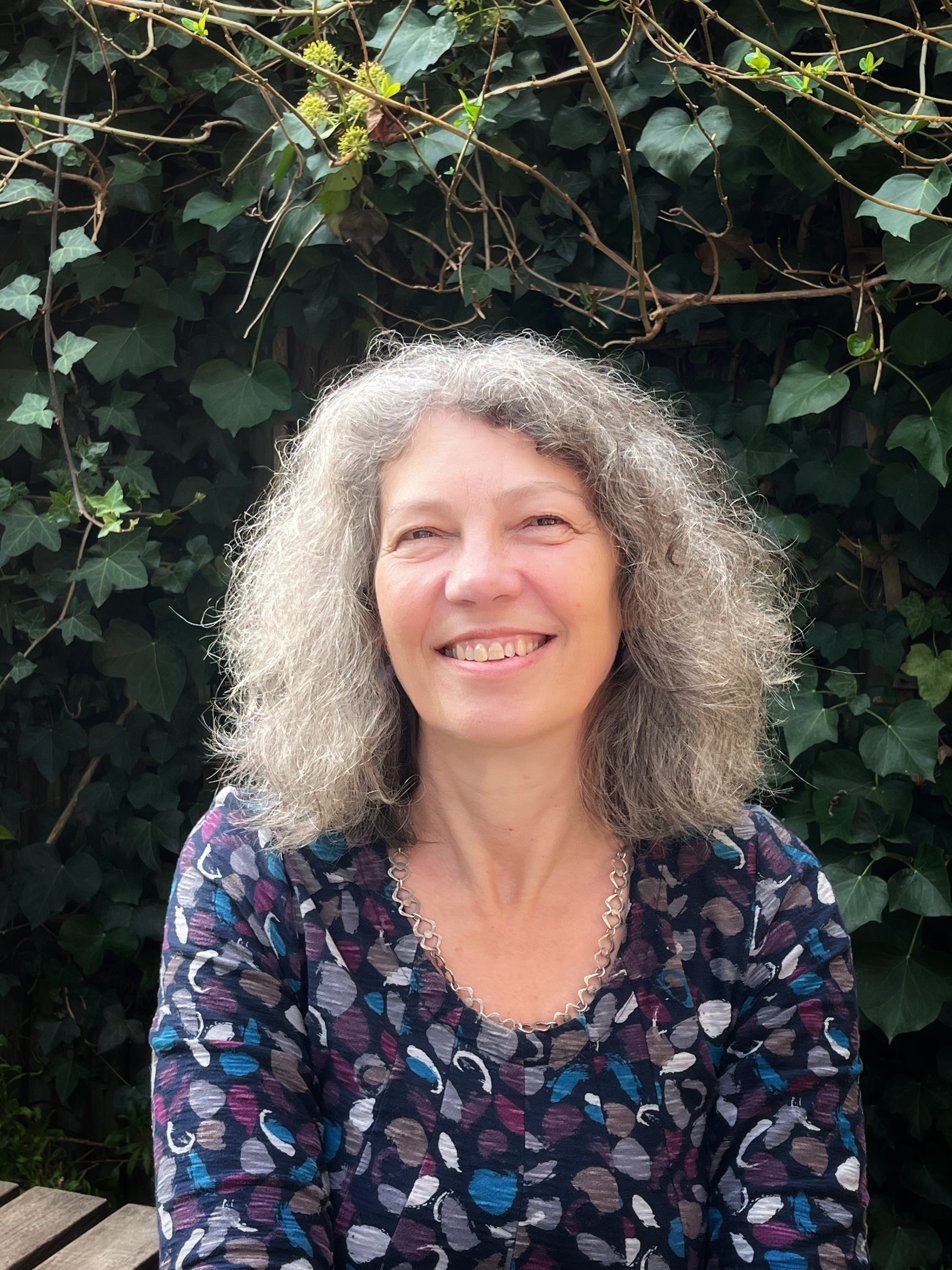
- Awards: OBE, for services to children and child Internet safety

Academic background
- Education: University of Oxford
- Thesis: Social knowledge and programme structure in representations of television characters (1987)
- Doctoral advisor: Michael Argyle

Academic work
- Discipline: Media and Communications
- Institutions: London School of Economics and Political Science
- Main interests: Children's Rights, Digital Technologies, Social Psychology, Policymaking, Research
- Notable ideas: The opportunities and risks afforded by digital and online technologies, particularly for children and young people

Sonia Mary Livingstone OBE FBA is a British scholar on the subjects of children, media, and the Internet. She is a Professor of Social Psychology and former head of the Department of Media and Communications at the London School of Economics and Political Science.

She has advised the UK government, European Commission, European Parliament, UN Committee on the Rights of the Child, OECD, ITU, and UNICEF, among others, on children’s internet safety and digital rights. In 2014, Livingstone was awarded the title of Officer of the Order of the British Empire (OBE) "for services to children and child Internet safety".

== Education and career ==
Livingstone holds a BSc degree in psychology from University College London. She obtained her DPhil in Psychology from the University of Oxford, during which she was supervised by Michael Argyle. She submitted her doctoral thesis in 1987 which was titled Social Knowledge and Programme Structure in Representations of Television Characters.

In 1993, Livingstone founded the MSc in Media and Communications degree at the London School of Economics, which continues to be offered today.

She has had academic appointments at the University of Oslo, the Paris-Panthéon-Assas University, and the Berkman Klein Center for Internet & Society at Harvard University.

== Career and research ==
Livingstone’s work focuses on the field of audience studies, and she places herself in the field of ‘reception studies.’ Livingstone states that one of her research interests is exploring how people "maintain a sense of themselves in a communication environment replete with meanings they didn't create".

=== Television audiences and consumption ===
In her earliest research, Livingstone focused on how television audiences respond and create meaning from various television genres, focusing specifically on soap operas. This work was recognised for the way in which she combined critical and social psychological theoretical frameworks and employed qualitative interview research methodologies.

Throughout the 1990s, Livingstone continued to publish research on different types of audiences, including expansions from her initial research on soap operas to include TV debates or discussions and studio audiences. Early in the decade she also worked on economic psychology alongside Peter Lunt, researching behaviours such as saving, borrowing and consumption. Some of these themes are captured in their 1992 book Mass Consumption and Personal Identity: Everyday Economic Experience.

=== New media and children's online presence ===
Since the 1990s, Livingstone studied the changing media environment and new media. Paying attention to changes in media technologies at the time, Livingstone wrote in 1999 of the need for an ‘inclusive conception of new media,’ noting that there is an increase in ‘personally owned media’ with diversification in ‘form and content,’ a ‘convergence of information services’ and ultimately the decline of mass communication into more ‘interactive’ modes.

A major focus of her research has been how children and younger audiences engage with digital media and the internet. In 2001 she published a book on these subjects titled Children and Their Changing Media Environment. Her 2002 book Young People and New Media continued studying the issues, marking a significant contribution to the study of young audiences. The book was commended for ‘delivering new and stimulating fresh insights‘ on how young people deal with new media.

As coordinator of the EU Kids Online research network, she presented the main findings and policy recommendations from the project, emphasising the need to separate risk from harm, and focusing on the relation between opportunities and risk. She argued that, "although both research and policy have tended to treat these as separable parts of children’s experience, the two are inextricably intertwined".

In the 2020s, Livingstone has called for conversations about children's growing use of devices to move beyond the fixation on 'screen time', a term often used in the media to quantify the extent of device use. She has pointed out that measures of screen time can be faulty and mean different things for measuring bodies, parents, and technology companies. Instead, she called for policymakers and carers to also take into account the qualitative experiences children have with digital media, accounting for the ‘content, context and connections associated with children’s digital engagement’.

Livingstone also runs the blog ‘Parenting for a Digital Future’ hosted by the London School of Economics and Political Science, with regular contributions from practitioners, researchers, and herself about children ‘growing up in a digital world.’

=== Notable projects ===
==== Digital Futures Commission ====
In association with the 5Rights Foundation, Livingstone led the Digital Futures Commission, a research collaboration aiming to inform the design of digital infrastructure around children's needs and interests. The initiative focused on three main themes: free play in a digital world, education data (including data produced by applications of education technology), and digital design that respects children's rights. The collaboration included researchers and representatives from the London School of Economics and Political Science (LSE), the University of Leeds, the Alan Turing Institute, The Lego Group, EY, and the BBC, among others. The project wrapped up in 2023.

==== Toddlers and Tablets ====
Between 2015 and 2018, Livingstone worked as a co-investigator in a research project about the increasing use of smart devices by children under the age of 5. Funded by the Australian Research Council, the project investigated 'family practices and attitudes around very young children’s internet use' in Australia and the United Kingdom, and provided recommendations for policymakers and parents of children under 5.

==== The Class ====
Livingstone directed 'The Class', a research project that examines on and offline experiences in teenagers’ learning. The Class was part of the MacArthur Foundation-funded Connected Learning Research Network. A namesake book on the study was published in 2016.

==== UK Children Go Online ====
The project investigated 9 to 19-year-olds' use of the Internet through qualitative interviews with children and parents. Accounting for age, socio-economic background, gender and other demographics, the study aimed to understand issues around Internet use, the digital divide, and the Internet's impact on learning, literacy, communication, and participation.

==== EU Kids Online I, II & III ====
Livingstone founded the EU Kids Online project, which focused on cultural, contextual, and risk issues in children's use of the Internet and new media. The project, which ran from 2006 to 2009, was funded by the European Commission Safer Internet Programme.

Follow-up projects ran from 2009 to 2011, and 2011 to 2014. By the final project, EU Kids Online III, the project had expanded to 33 countries.

==== Digital Futures for Children centre ====
Since October 2023, Livingstone has been the director of the Digital Futures for Children centre (DFC). DFC is a joint research centre of the 5Rights Foundation and the London School of Economics and Political Science and builds on their previous work in the Digital Futures Commission. The UN Committee on the Rights of the Child’s General comment No. 25 serves as the framework of the research centre. The DFC's stated aims include conducting research on children's rights in the digital environment, providing an evidence base for advocacy, and amplifying children's voices so they are represented in research, policy, and practice.

== Awards and honours ==
In July 2018 she was elected Fellow of the British Academy (FBA). Livingstone was appointed Officer of the Order of the British Empire (OBE) in the Queen's 2014 New Year Honours for services to children and child Internet safety. She received the Erasmus Medal in 2019 for "contribution[s] to European culture and scientific achievement".

== Selected books ==
- Parenting for a Digital Future (with Alicia Blum-Ross). Oxford University Press, 2020
- The Class: Living and learning in the digital age. (with Julian Sefton-Green), New York University Press, 2016
- Media Regulation: Governance and the interests of citizens and consumers (with Peter Lunt). Sage, 2012.
- Children and the Internet: Great Expectations, Challenging Realities. Polity. 2009.
- Media Consumption and Public Engagement: Beyond the Presumption of Attention, editions 1 and 2 (with Nick Couldry and Tim Markham) Palgrave. 2007, 2010.
- Harm and Offence in Media Content: A review of the empirical literature, editions 1 and 2. (with Andrea Millwood Hargrave). Intellect Press. 2006, 2009.
- Young People and New Media: Childhood and the Changing Media Environment. Sage. 2002
