= Publics =

Publics are small groups of people who follow one or more particular issue very closely. They are well informed about the issue(s) and also have a very strong opinion on it/them. They tend to know more about politics than the average person, and, therefore, exert more influence, because these people care so deeply about their cause(s) that they donate a lot of time and money. Therefore, politicians are unlikely be reelected by not pleasing the publics while in office.

== Issue publics ==
Issue publics are groups of people who pay attention to one particular issue. One can be part of more than one issue public. So called "passionate publics" can also shape markets and the perceptions of different products, as seen in the discursive shaping of market categories by reviewers of whiskey products.

The term was introduced by Philip Converse in The Nature of Belief Systems in Mass Publics (1964). He defined it in contrast to mass public.

== Attentive publics ==
Attentive publics are groups of people who pay attention to several particular issues.

== Publics in public relations ==
The concept of publics has also been influential in public relations theory. Public relations scholar James E. Grunig developed the situational theory of publics to explain how groups form and communicate around problems or issues. The theory distinguishes publics from the general population and identifies them according to factors including their recognition of a problem, recognition of constraints on addressing it, and level of involvement.

In the situational theory, people may be classified as nonpublics, latent publics, aware publics, or active publics. Latent publics are affected by a problem but do not recognize it, while aware publics recognize the problem and active publics organize or communicate in response to it. The framework is used to identify groups that are likely to seek or process information and become involved with particular issues.

The concept is also reflected in professional definitions of public relations. In 2012, the Public Relations Society of America (PRSA) adopted a definition of public relations as "a strategic communication process that builds mutually beneficial relationships between organizations and their publics." PRSA defines a public as a group of people connected by a common factor or interest, and distinguishes a public from an audience, whose members may receive the same message without necessarily having a common connection.

== See also ==
- Audiences / audience studies
- Environmental politics
