= Dialogic public relations theory =

Theory on organisations' public interactions

Dialogue is defined as “any negotiated exchange of ideas and opinions”. Public relations can facilitate dialogue by establishing channels and procedures for dialogic communication. Dialogic theory argues that organizations should be willing to interact with publics in honest and ethical ways in order to create effective organization-public communication channels.

== Historical development ==
The concept of dialogue has its roots in various disciplines such as philosophy, rhetoric, psychology, and relational communication. Philosophers and rhetoricians have long perceived dialogue as one of the most ethical forms of communication and as one of the central means of separating truth from falsehood. Theologian Martin Buber was considered as the father of the modern concept of dialogue. In public relations, dialogue was explained as “communicating about issues with publics”. There has been a theoretical shift from public relations reflecting an emphasis on managing communication to an emphasis on communication as a tool for establishing relationships.

The consideration of dialogue as a public relations theory should be attributed to Pearson. According to Pearson (1989), public relations can be conceptualized as the management of interpersonal dialectic. After that, Botan claimed that “dialogue manifests itself more as a stance, orientation, or bearing in communication rather than as a specific method, technique, or format” (p. 192). Kent and Taylor argued that “dialogue is product rather than process” (p. 323) and viewed the symmetrical model as a procedural way to listen or solicit feedback. Furthermore, clarified the concept of dialogue in public relations and proposed principles of dialogic theory.

== Key concepts ==
=== Features ===
Dialogue as an orientation has five features:

- Mutuality, or the recognition of organization-public relationship. Without the publics, organizations have no purpose. Seeking collaboration through the publics through dialogue will contribute towards successful relationship building.
- Propinquity, or the temporality and spontaneity of interactions with the public. By even asking the publics for their input before the decision making process could be beneficial depending on the organization/activity/idea. The utilization of a dialogic loop online is a way for the public's voices to be heard. As well as, making the organization present to its publics.
- Empathy, or the supportiveness and confirmation of public goals and interests. Support is extremely important. Being able to collaborate to maintain a communal mindset is essential. The idea of a communal mindset shows the importance in building the community, not solely the organization.
- Risk, or the intention to communicate with publics on their own terms. The amount of information shared or the type of information shared with another organization or publics leads to vulnerability and unexpected consequences.
- Commitment, or the degree to which an organization gives itself over to dialogue, interpretation, and understanding in its interactions with publics. Even if someone does not agree with the views of another, one must acknowledge the view as valid and try to find middle ground.

=== Principles ===
Kent and Taylor proposed five dialogic principles which could guide organizations to establish dialogic relationships with publics on websites:

- Dialogic Loop

A dialogic loop allows publics to query organizations and provides organizations with the opportunity to respond to questions, concerns, and problems.

- Usefulness of Information

Websites should make efforts to post information of general value to all publics.

- Generation of Return Visits

Websites should include features that make them attractive for repeat visits such as updated information, changing issues, and special forums.

- The Intuitiveness / Ease of Interface

Websites should provide conveniences that are intuitive for visitor navigation and understanding. Organized and hierarchical tables of contents can assist with ease of interfacing.

- Conservation of Visitors

Websites should contain only essential links with clearly marked paths for visitors to return to the sites.

== Extension ==
The dialogic theory has been extended to explain how various organizations build dialogic relationships with publics through websites, blogs, and social media, such as Facebook and Twitter. For instance, Esrock and Leichty studied the dialogic capacity of organizational Web sites and found that the minority of Fortune 500 organizations employed Kent and Taylor's principles of dialogic communication. Using dialogic principles can positively impact relationships with publics, as seen in a study on environmental advocacy organizations. The organizations that employed dialogic strategies on their Facebook profiles led to greater dialogic engagement between organizations and visitors.
