= Organization–public relationships =

Management of relationship between an organization and the public

Organization–public relationships is public relations between an organization and the public.

== History ==
Viewing relationships as the core of public relations research was first advocated by Mary Ann Ferguson in 1984. The relational perspective became a major theory development in the field.

It took nearly 15 years for Ledingham and Bruning (1998) to propose a working definition of relationship management. Hon and Grunig (1999) outlined measurements for organisational relationships and suggested strategies that could be helpful in understanding these relationships. The burst of excitement around the emerging relationship paradigm at the end of the 20th century led to significant scholarship dedicated to understanding the role relationships play in public relations.

Ferguson investigated 171 public relations research abstracts published in Public Relation Review from 1975 to 1984. Ferguson identified social responsibility and ethics; social issues and issue management; and public relationships as important concepts. Ferguson predicted that public relationships had the greatest potential for theory development. She asserted that relationships between an organization and its key audiences were central to public relations research. Ferguson's widely cited paper was never published.

After conceptualizing OPR, researchers started proposing characteristics that could best represent the quality of organization–public relationships. Proposals:

- Dynamic/static, open/closed, mutual satisfaction/dissatisfaction, distribution of power and mutual understanding, agreement, and consensus (Ferguson, 1984).
- Reciprocity, trust, credibility, mutual legitimacy, openness, mutual satisfaction, and mutual understanding (Grunig, Grunig, Ehling, 1992).
- Openness, trust, involvement, investment, and commitment (Ledingham, Bruning, Thomlison, Lesko, 1997) operationalized through stakeholders' discussion groups
- Investment, commitment, trust, comfort with relational dialectics, cooperation, mutual goals, interdependence, power imbalance, performance satisfaction, comparison level of the alternatives, adaptation, non-retrievable investment, shared technology, summate constructs, structural bonds, social bonds, intimacy, and passion (Ledingham, Bruning, Thomlison, Lesko, 1997).
- Open communication, the level of trust, the level of involvement, investment in community, and long-term commitment (Ledingham, Bruning, 1998).

== Dimensions ==
Ledingham and Bruning's dimensions are: openness, trust, involvement, investment, and commitment. Their statistical analysis categorized OPR dimensions into three distinct types: personal, professional, and community. They claimed that these dimensions could be used to predict public choices. Hon and Grunig (1999) developed quantitative measurement scales for assessing six proposed dimensions of an organization–public relationship: control mutuality, trust, satisfaction, commitment, exchange relationships, and communal relationships. The Hon/Grunig scale, developed under the auspices of the Public Relations Institute, and the Bruning/Ledingham scale, as well as others, have been used in studies by these and other scholars.

=== Definitions ===
- Control mutuality–the degree to which parties agree on who has the rightful power to influence another. Although some imbalance is natural, stable relationships require that organizations and audiences each have some control.
- Trust–Acceptance that the organization is "doing what you say you will do" (Ledingham and Bruning, 1998). A willingness to communicate frankly to the other party. Trust has three dimensions:
  - Integrity: the belief that an organization is fair and just.
  - Dependability: the belief that an organization will do what it says it will do.
  - Competence: the belief that an organization has the ability to do what it says it will do (Hon/Grunig). The notion of a fiduciary relationship operates particularly when a not-for-profit organization is a party to the relationship (Ledingham/Bruning).
- Commitment–The extent to which each party believes and feels that the relationship is worth spending energy to maintain and promote. Commitment has two dimensions:
  - Continuance commitment: a certain line of action
  - Affective commitment, an emotional orientation (Hon/Grunig).
- Satisfaction–The extent to which each party feels favorably toward the other because of positive expectations about the relationship. A satisfying relationship is one in which the benefits outweigh the costs.
- Exchange relationships–"They provide a fair way for people to obtain many goods and services that might not be available to them in close, communal relationships in which benefits are given to support the others' welfare non-contingently"
- Reciprocal relationships–one party gives benefits to the other only because the other has provided benefits in the past or is expected to do so in the future.
- Communal relationships–both parties provide benefits to the other because they are concerned for the welfare of the other—even without reciprocity. For most public relations activities, communal relationships are much more important than exchange relationships.
- Favor and face–favor (or reneging) connotes a set of social norms by which one must abide to get along well with other people, particularly in Chinese society. In public relations, it is a mode of conduct in which individuals stay in contact with influential parties. Face (mianzi) is a resource that can be exchanged between individuals as a means of securing favors. Maintaining face is important in social interactions, especially for expanding or enhancing human networks.
- Openness–consistent sharing of plans between parties in a relationship.

== See also ==
- Stakeholder theory
- Corporate communications
- Organizational communication
- Public relations

== Bibliography ==
  - Broom, G. M., Casey, S., & Ritchey, J. (1997). Toward a concept and theory of organization–public relationships. Journal of Public Relations Research, 9(2), 83–98.
  - Ferguson, M. A. (1984, August). Building theory in public relations: Interorganizational relationships. Paper presented at the annual convention of the Association for Education in Journalism and Mass Communication, Gainesville, FL.
  - Grunig, J. E., Grunig, L. A., & Ehling, W. P. (1992). What is an effective organization? In J. E. Grunig (Ed.), Excellence public relations and communication management: Contributions to effective organizations (pp. 65–89). Hillsdale, NJ: Lawrence Erlbaum Associates.
  - Hon, C. L., & Grunig, J. E. (1999). Guidelines for measuring relationships in public relations. Gainesville, FL: The Institute for Public Relations.
  - Huang, Y. (1998, August). Public relations strategies and organization–public relationships. Paper presented at the annual conference of the International Communication Association, San Francisco.
  - Huang, Y. (2001). OPRA: A cross-cultural, multiple-item scale for measuring organization–public relationships. Journal of Public Relations Research, 13(1), 61–90.
  - Ledingham, J. A., & Bruning, S. D. (1998). Relationship management in public relations: Dimensions of an organization–public relationship. Public Relations Review, 24(1), 55–65.
  - Ledingham, J. A., Bruning, S. D., Thomlison, T. D., & Lesko, C. (1997). The applicability of the interpersonal relationship dimensions to an organizational context: Toward a theory of relational loyalty; a qualitative approach. Academy of Managerial Communication Journal, 1(1), 23–43.
