= Situational theory of problem solving =

Theory

The situational theory of problem solving attempts to explain why and how an individual communicates during a problematic situation. The situational theory of problem solving (STOPS) was proposed by Jeong-Nam Kim and James E. Grunig in 2011 though their article “problem solving and communicative action: A situational theory of problem solving.” The theory was developed from the situational theory of publics (STP) and claimed it is “an extended and generalized version” of STP. This theory has an assumption that “the more one commits to problem resolution, the more one becomes acquisitive of information pertaining to the problem, selective in dealing with information, and transmissive in giving it to others.”

== History ==
=== Extension from situational theory of publics ===
STP has been heavily used in the field of public relations to understand why and how publics communicate. The original situational theory uses three independent variables (problem recognition, constraint recognition, and involvement recognition) to predict the dependent variable of information seeking and processing.

STOPS was proposed to overcome four limitations of STP:

1. STP considered only information acquisition as a concept of active communication behaviors
2. The predictive power of referent criterion variable has been unclear throughout the development of STP
3. Only few antecedents of communication behavior were considered
4. STP was underutilized because of the narrow concept of information behaviors

Alterations in existed variables (problem recognition, constraint recognition, involvement recognition, and reference criterion) were done to explain communicative action in problem solving variable. STOPS also expanded the focus of the theory from "decisions" to a more general concept of life "problems." A new variable, situational motivation in problem solving, was added to mediate the effects of predictive variables of communicative behavior.

== Concepts of key variables ==
=== Situational antecedents: perceptual and cognitive frame in problem solving ===
- Problem Recognition: “one’s perception that something is missing and that there is no immediately applicable solution to it.”
- Constraint Recognition: perceived obstacles in a problem-solving task that reduce one's ability to do anything about the issue. Constraint recognition limit one's communication behaviors even when he or she has high problem recognition and/or involvement recognition.
- Involvement Recognition: “a perceived connection between the self and the problem situation.” This variable has the same concept of the level of involvement in the situational theory of publics.
- Referent Criterion: “any knowledge or subjective judgmental system that influences the way in which one approaches problem solving.”

=== Situational motivation in problem solving ===
The extent to which an individual wants to know more about a problem. This concept mediates the effect of problem recognition, constraint recognition, and involvement recognition. Referent criterion would be independent of this variable because it is more cognitive than perceptual.

=== Communicative behavior in problem solving ===
When an individual tries to solve a problem, his or her communicative activeness increases in three domains of communication action: information acquisition, selection, and transmission.

==== Information acquisition ====
The communicative action that is relevant to the degrees of information searching for problem solving.

- Information seeking (active): a planned perusing of messages about a specific topic.
- Information attending (passive): an unplanned exposure for messages about a specific topic.

==== Information selection ====
The communicative action that is relevant to the extent of an individual's directedness in acquiring and sharing information.

- Information forefending (active): “the extent to which a communicator fends off certain information in advance by judging its value and relevance for a given problem-solving task.” Individuals with higher information forefending look for more specific, systematic, and accurate information.
- Information permitting (passive): the extent to which an individual accept any information related to a problem-solving task.

==== Information transmission ====
The communicative action that is relevant to the degrees of educating others to utilize collective behaviors for problem solving.

- Information forwarding (active): forwarding information even if no one requests for one's opinion, idea, or expertise about a problem.
- Information sharing (passive): sharing of information only when other person asks for one's opinion, idea, or expertise about a problem.

== Model ==
An individual's perception toward a problematic life situation, motivation to solve the problem, and activation of cognitive frames influence an individual's activeness in six information behaviors – information forefending, information permitting, information forwarding, information sharing, information seeking, and information attending.

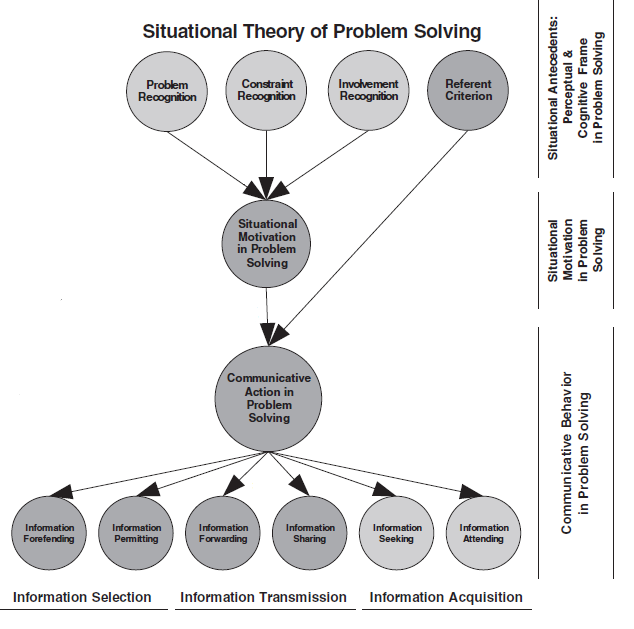
Model of Situational Theory of Problem Solving

== Applications of the theory ==
STOPS has more than 200 research bibliographies in academic databases such as Communication & Mass Media Complete, Business Source Premier, and Academic Search Premier. Some of the applications of this theory are in the fields of health communication, crisis communication, organizational communication, and nonprofit communication.
