= Sarah Street =

British film academic

Sarah Street (born Cardiff, 1958) is professor of Film and Foundation Chair of Drama at University of Bristol.

== Education ==
Street received a Bachelor of Arts in 1980 from University of Warwick and in 1985 a Doctor of Philosophy from Oxford University.

== Research ==
Street researches 20th-century British film, with a special focus on color film, costume design, and set design. In 1997, she wrote British National Cinema, the first substantial overview of this subject; it is now in its second edition.

In 2012, she received a grant from the Leverhulme Trust to research color cinema in the 1920s. From 2016 to 2019, Street was the principal investigator of a grant from the Arts and Humanities Research Council to research Eastmancolor, a type of color film produced by Kodak that was introduced to Britain in the 1950s. She has received other AHRC research grants for British color film. In 2019 she was awarded an Advanced Grant by the European Research Council for STUDIOTEC, a 5-year project on European Film Studios, 1930-60. From 2023-26 she was Co-Investigator on the AHRC funded 3-year research project Film Costumes in Action.

She served as an editor of the journal Screen from 2001-26 and on the editorial board of Journal of British Cinema and Television. She is also a jury member for Best British Film of the Iris Prize, a queer film festival.

== Honors and awards ==
Her book Colour Films in Britain received the 2014 First Prize for Best Monograph from The British Association of Film, Television and Screen Studies. In 2019, Street received The Colour Group (Great Britain) Turner Medal, which honors artists or art historians. In 2020, she and Joshua Yumibe received the 2020 Katherine Singer Kovács Book Award from the Society for Cinema and Media Studies for their book Chromatic Modernity (2019). In 2024, Street was elected a Fellow of the Royal Historical Society.

== Publications ==
- Dickinson, Margaret and Sarah Street. Cinema and State: Film Industry and the British Government, 1927–84. United Kingdom: Bloomsbury Academic, 1985.
- Street, Sarah. British National Cinema. United Kingdom: Routledge, 1997. Republished in 2008. ISBN 9780415067355
- Street, Sarah. British Cinema in Documents. United Kingdom: Routledge, 2000. Republished in 2016. ISBN 9780415168014, 0415168015
- Street, Sarah. Costume and Cinema: Dress Codes in Popular Film. United Kingdom: Wallflower, 2001. ISBN 9781903364185, 1903364183
- Street, Sarah. Transatlantic Crossings: British Feature Films in the USA. United Kingdom: Bloomsbury Academic, 2002. ISBN 9780826413963, 082641396X
- Street, Sarah. Black Narcissus: Turner Classic Movies British Film Guide. United Kingdom: I. B. Tauris, 2005. ISBN 1845110463
- Harris, Sue, Sarah Street and Tim Bergfelder. Film Architecture and the Transnational Imagination: Set Design in 1930s European Cinema (Film Culture in Transition). Amsterdam: Amsterdam University Press, 2007. ISBN 9789053569801, 9053569804
- Street, Sarah and Jackie Stacey, editors. Queer Screen: A Screen Reader. United Kingdom: Routledge, 2005. ISBN 9780415384315
- Street, Sarah. Colour Films in Britain: The Negotiation of Innovation 1900–1955. United Kingdom: British Film Institute, 2012. ISBN 1844573125
  - 2nd edition: Street, Sarah. Colour Films in Britain: The Negotiation of Innovation 1900–1955. United Kingdom: Bloomsbury Publishing, 2019. ISBN 9781838715151, 1838715150
- Street, Sarah and Jill Forbes. European Cinema: An Introduction. United Kingdom: Macmillan Education, Limited, 2017. ISBN 9781137080349, 1137080345
- Giovanna Fossati et al. The Colour Fantastic: Chromatic Worlds of Silent Cinema. Netherlands: Amsterdam University Press, 2018. ISBN 9789462983014
- Street, Sarah. Deborah Kerr. United Kingdom: Bloomsbury Publishing, 2019. ISBN 9781838715236, 1838715231
- Yumibe, Joshua and Sarah Street. Chromatic Modernity: Color, Cinema, and Media of the 1920s. United States: Columbia University Press, 2019. ISBN 9780231542289, 0231542283
- Street, Sarah. Pinewood: Anatomy of a Film Studio in Post-war Britain. United Kingdom: Palgrave Macmillan, 2024. ISBN 978-3-031-51306-0
- Street, Sarah et al. Film Studios in Britain, France, Germany and Italy: Architecture, Innovation, Labour, Politics, 1930-60. United Kingdom: British Film Institute, 2026. ISBN 978-1-83902-534-1
