= Audience studies =

Audience studies is a discipline and field of study, a sub-set of media studies, that investigates the processes of media audiences using different methodologies to test and develop theories of audiences' processes of reception. Much of the field borrows concepts from literary theory and research approaches from cultural studies. The primary media of study are film and television and the field intersects in many ways, including its methods used and its focus on everyday media audiences, with fan studies (as popularly established by Henry Jenkins). Audience studies emerged as a field in the early 20th century as a form of market research, but slowly, with the rise of film studies, became popular in an academic context.

Audience studies research is frequently published in journals such as the Journal of British Cinema and Television, Participations: Journal of Audience & Reception Studies, and Transformative Works and Cultures. Such research is frequently used by censorship institutions such as the BBFC to understand public opinion on censorship and ask questions about the effects of violent media. The study of the "effects" of violent media on audiences is a key debate within audience studies, with many audience studies experts criticizing theories of "copycat violence" and reviews of previous studies conducted for the BBFC finding no evidence to substantiate claims of the role of violent media in inspiring crime. The media violence debate, however, is only a small part of a wider academic sub-field which seeks to understand the relationships between media and its audiences through conducting empirical research.

== Research methods ==
Data collection methods used in audience studies research frequently involve surveys, interviews, and focus groups. Audience studies differs in this respect from reception studies, which focuses on critical writings about film texts and does not draw on data from audiences. Recent, large-scale audience studies, such as those on The Lord of the Rings and The Hobbit film series, have employed international surveys and a mixture of qualitative and quantitative research methods.

Historical audience studies are also common, investigating how audiences engaged with films in the past, as in studies of "cinema memory" of cinema-going in the 1930s and of The Exorcist and Alien. Historical studies of audiences, particularly in the New Cinema History tradition, may also employ archival materials such as letters, trade records, and a variety of other sources, including archived surveys, oral histories, and magazine and newspaper stories.
