= Ledingham =

Ledingham may refer to:

- George Aleck Ledingham (1903-1962), a Canadian mycologist
- John Charles Grant Ledingham (1875-1944) Scottish pathologist and bacteriologist
- Jonathan Kelly (born Jonathan Ledingham in 1947), an Irish folk rock singer-songwriter
- Una Ledingham, British physician
- Walt Ledingham (born 1950), a professional ice hockey player
