= New Cinema History =

New Cinema History is a movement of media historians dedicated to rewriting film history as a social history of film cultures, instead of merely an art history of the moving image. In the early 1990s, Annette Kuhn was among the first scholars to systematically research cinemagoing, in the context of the project "Cinema Culture in 1930s Britain." Following the example of 'New Film History', while distinguishing from it, Richard Maltby coined the term 'New Cinema History,' as "a body of work that focuses on the circulation and consumption of film and examines cinema as a site of social and cultural exchange." Maltby's terminology partly aimed to institutionalize and expand to an international scale his prior decade-long collaboration with Melvyn Stokes researching Hollywood film audiences, and coincided with the formation of the HoMER Network: History of Moviegoing, Exhibition and Reception.

New Cinema History asks questions like, 'Who is going to the movies? Where are the theaters located? Why are they located there? What do people remember about going to the movies?' Richard Maltby argued that the films themselves were the most “expendable element of the experience of cinema.” Oral history plays a large role in New Cinema History, and one will quickly find that people remember what it was like to go to the movies, not necessarily the films themselves.

== HoMER ==
The HoMER Network (History of Moviegoing, Exhibition and Reception) is a project that was founded in June of 2004 in order to understand the phenomena of film going and film reception itself. The project is led by two Co-Ordinator's, Talitha Ferraz and Matthew Jones. The goal of HoMER is to create a central hub of information on the aspects of New Cinema History (film going, exhibition, and reception) from data across the Internet.
