= Journal of British Cinema and Television =

- Discipline: Film, media, and cultural studies
- Language: English
- Edited by: Julian Petley, James Chapman

Publication details
- History: 2004–present
- Publisher: Edinburgh University Press (United Kingdom)
- Frequency: Quarterly

Standard abbreviations
- ISO 4: J. Br. Cine. Telev.

Indexing
- ISSN: 1743-4521 (print); 1755-1714 (web)
- OCLC no.: 56990181

Links
- Journal homepage

The Journal of British Cinema and Television is a quarterly academic journal published by Edinburgh University Press in May, August and December of each year. It was established in 2004. Themed issues alternate with regular issues and every issue contains papers, book reviews, interviews and conferences.

== See also ==
- List of film periodicals
