= Situational theory of publics =

Theory

The situational theory of publics theorizes that large groups of people can be divided into smaller groups based on the extent to which they are aware of a problem and the extent to which they do something about the problem. For example, some people may begin uninformed and uninvolved; communications to them may be intended to make them aware and engaged. Communications to those who are aware but disengaged may focus on informing them of ways in which they could act. Further classifications are made on the basis to which people are actively seeking or passively encountering ("stumbling into") information about the problem.

== Overview ==
The situational theory of publics, developed by Professor James E. Grunig in University of Maryland, College Park, defines that publics can be identified and classified in the context to which they are aware of the problem and the extent to which they do something about the problem. This theory explains when people communicate and when communications aimed at people are most likely to be effective. The concepts in the theory parallel those with the Dewey and Blumer’s definition of publics.

It is possible for a person to be a member of one public with respect to a certain problem, and a member of a different public with respect to a different problem. For example, one person may be attentive and engaged with respect to climate change, but uninformed and uninvolved with respect to racial inequality. A different person may be informed but uninvolved in both problems.

== Key concepts as variables ==
- Problem recognition (Independent Variable)

Problem recognition is the extent to which individuals recognize a problem facing them. People do not stop to think about situations unless they perceive that something needs to be done to improve the situation (Grunig & Hunt, 1984, p. 149).

- Constraint recognition (Independent Variable)

Constraint recognition is the extent to which individuals see their behaviors as limited by factors beyond their own control. Constraints can be psychological, such as low self-efficacy; self-efficacy is the conviction that one is capable of executing a behavior required to produce certain outcomes (Witte & Allen, 2000). Constraints can also be physical, such as a lack of access to protective gear.

- Level of involvement (Independent Variable)

Level of involvement is a measure of how personally and emotionally relevant a problem can be for an individual (Grunig & Hunt, 1984). Involvement increases the likelihood of individuals attending to and comprehending messages (Pavlik, 1988). Dervin (1989) stated that messages will be attended to only if the benefits or dangers associated with them have “taken on some kind of personal reality or usefulness for the individual” (p. 68). In general, persons with high involvement analyze issues more often, prefer messages that contain more and better arguments (Heath, Liao, & Douglas, 1995; Petty & Cacioppo, 1981, 1986), and attain greater knowledge levels (Chaffee & Roser, 1986; Engelberg, Flora, & Nass, 1995).

- Information seeking (Dependent Variable)

Information seeking can also be called “active communication behavior.” Actively communicating members of publics look for information and try to understand it when they obtain the information. Thus, publics whose members seek information become aware publics more often than publics whose members do not communicate or who only process information.

- Information processing (Dependent Variable)

Information processing can be called “passive communication behavior.” Passively communicating members of a public will not look for information, but they will often process information that comes to them randomly, that is, without any effort on their part.

== History ==
The situational theory of publics originated in James E. Grunig's journalism monograph titled “The Role of Information in Economic Decision Making” in 1966. That was the first step in the development of a theory that today is known as the situational theory of publics. That monograph introduced the first variable in the theory, problem recognition, as an explanation of why people sometimes engage in genuine decision-making and sometimes engage in habitual behavioral.

In his doctoral dissertation on the economic decision making processes of large landowners in Colombia, Grunig developed the second variable of the theory, constraint recognition. Together, problem recognition and constraint recognition explained when and why people actively seek information. Later, Grunig added Herbert Krugman's concept of level of involvement to the theory to explain the difference between active communication behavior (information seeking) and passive communication behavior (information processing).

In his 1984 textbook, Managing Public Relations, and in a number of studies published before and after the textbook, Grunig further developed the theory from an explanation of individual communication behavior to a theory of publics-based in part on John Dewey's book, The Public and Its Problems.

== Development ==
Grunig and others who used the theory developed statistical methods through which the theory could be used to segment different kinds of publics and to explain the likely effects of communication for each public. Since that time the theory has been used widely in academic studies and to some extent in professional practice and research.

The theory also resembles theories of consumer behavior, health communication, media exposure, and political communication popular in other domains of communication research. However, the situational theory of publics contains more variables and has a more developed system of measurement and analysis than these other theories. As a result, it is capable of subsuming many other theories.

== Extension ==
Although the situational theory was well developed by 1984, it has continued to be a growing and developing theory. It has been extended to explain why people join activist groups; internal and external dimensions have been identified for problem recognition, level of involvement, and constraint recognition; and research has been conducted to determine whether information campaigns (which generally are passively processed) can create publics. Among them, some research on the situational theory has examined external and internal dimensions of the three independent variables (Grunig & Hon, 1988; Grunig, 1997). If the three concepts (problem recognition, constraint recognition and involvement), are internal (only perceived), then they could be changed by communication, and if they are external (real/actual), then “changes must be made in a person’s environment before his or her perceptions … and communication behavior will change” (Grunig, 1997, p. 25). Although only a few studies have focused on internal and external dimensions, findings have indicated that the distinction is worthy of further exploration (Grunig, 1997). In 2011, Jeong-Nam Kim and Grunig extended the theory to the situational theory of problem solving.
