= James E. Grunig =

Public relations theorist

- Born: April 18, 1942 (age 84)
- Education: Iowa State University; University of Wisconsin–Madison
- Occupations: Public relations theorist Professor Emeritus
- Known for: Public relations

James E. Grunig (born April 18, 1942) is a public relations theorist and Professor Emeritus for the Department of Communication at the University of Maryland.

== Biography ==
Grunig was born on April 18, 1942. He received a B.S. from Iowa State University, 1964 in Agricultural Journalism and an MS from the University of Wisconsin, 1966 in Agricultural Economics. He then received his Ph.D. from the University of Wisconsin–Madison in 1968 with a thesis "Information, entrepreneurship, and economic development: A study of the decision making processes of Colombian latifundistas" He is married to Larissa A. Grunig.

He was an assistant Professor, Land Tenure Center, University of Wisconsin, 1968–69, and then Assistant Professor(1969–72). Associate Professor (1972-78) and Full Professor (1978–99), all at the College of Journalism, University of Maryland. From 1999 until his retirement in 2005, he was Professor in the Department of Communication, University of Maryland; following that, he was an emeritus Professor in that department.

== Work ==
His theories including the four models of Public Relations:

Model Name	Type of Communication	Model Characteristics
Press agentry/publicity	One-way communication	Uses persuasion and manipulation to influence audiences to behave as the organization desires
Public information model	One-way communication	Uses press releases and other one-way communication techniques to distribute organizational information. The public relations practitioner is often referred to as the in-house journalist
Two-way asymmetrical model	Two-way communication (imbalanced)	Uses persuasion and manipulation to influence audiences to behave as the organization desires. Differs from the press agentry model through the use of research to find out how best to persuade stakeholders
Two-way symmetrical model	Two-way communication	Uses communication to negotiate with the public, resolve conflict and promote mutual understanding and respect between the organization and its stakeholders

Grunig has published 250 articles, books, chapters, papers, and reports on public relations. He has received awards and honors from the Public Relations Society of America and the Institute for Public Relations Research. A Festschrift, "The future of excellence in public relations and communication management: challenges for the next generation" was published to mark his retirement in 2005

From July through August 2004, he was Wee Kim Wee Professor, School of Communication and Information, Nanyang Technological University, Singapore; from 2000 through 2004 he was Honorary Visiting Professor, Zhongshan University, Guangzhou, China.

== Bibliography ==
=== Book written or co-written ===
- Grunig, L. A., Grunig, J. E., & Dozier, D. M. (2002). Excellent public relations and effective organizations: A study of communication management in three countries. Mahwah, NJ: Lawrence Erlbaum Associates, 653 pp.
- Dozier, D. M. with Grunig, L. A., & Grunig, J. E. (1995). Manager's Guide to Excellence in Public Relations and Communication Management. Mahwah, NJ: Lawrence Erlbaum Associates, 258 pp.
- Hunt, T., & Grunig, J. E. (1994). Public relations techniques. Fort Worth, TX: Harcourt Brace, 417 pp.
  - Grunig, J. E., & Hunt, T. (2000). Dirección de relaciones públicas. Barcelona, Spain: Gestión 2000. (Spanish translation of Managing public relations.)
  - Hunt T., & Grunig, J. E. (1995). Tehnike odnosov z javnostmi. Ljubljana, Slovenia: DZS. (Slovenian translation of Public relations techniques.)
- Grunig, J. E. & Hunt, T. (1984). Managing public relations. New York: Holt, Rinehart & Winston, 550 pp.

== Books edited or coedited ==
- Grunig, J. E. (Ed.) (1992). Excellence in public relations and communication management. Hillsdale, NJ: Lawrence Erlbaum Associates, 666 pp.
- Grunig, L. A., & Grunig, J. E. (Eds.) (1991). Public relations research annual (Vol. 3). Hillsdale, NJ: Lawrence Erlbaum Associates, 232 pp.
- Grunig, L. A., & Grunig, J. E. (Eds.) (1990). Public relations research annual (Vol. 2). Hillsdale, NJ: Lawrence Erlbaum Associates, 265 pp.
- Grunig, J. E., & Grunig, L. A. (Eds.) (1989). Public relations research annual (Vol. 1). Hillsdale, NJ: Lawrence Erlbaum Associates, 223 pp.
- Grunig, J. E. (Ed.) (1976). Decline of the global village: How specialization is changing the mass media. Bayside, NY: General Hall, 297 pp.

== See also ==
- Situational theory of publics
- Situational theory of problem solving
