= Clubhouse (app) =

Audio-based social networking service

- Developer: Alpha Exploration Co.
- Release: March 2020; 6 years ago

Stable release(s) [±]
- Android: 1.0.33 / April 7, 2022; 4 years ago
- iOS: 1.0.46 / March 22, 2022; 4 years ago
- Written in: Python; Django; Next.js
- Operating system: Android 7 or above; iOS 13 or above
- Size: 22 MB (Android); 80.6 MB (iOS)
- Available in: English
- Type: Voice over IP (VoIP)
- License: Freeware
- Website: clubhouse.com

Clubhouse is an American social audio app for iOS and Android developed by Alpha Exploration Co. that enables users to participate in real-time, audio-only communication within virtual "rooms". Launched in March 2020 by Paul Davison and Rohan Seth, the platform is characterized by its "drop-in" nature, where users can join live discussions on a wide range of topics as either listeners or speakers.

The application gained attention in early 2021, operating on an invite-only model and featuring appearances from public figures such as Elon Musk, Oprah Winfrey, and Mark Zuckerberg. During this period, Clubhouse reached a reported valuation of approximately $4 billion and contributed to the expansion of similar social audio features like Twitter Spaces and Spotify Greenroom. The app later expanded to Android in May 2021 and removed its waitlist in July 2021, opening access to the general public.

== History ==
Clubhouse began as an invite only social media startup by Paul Davison and Rohan Seth in Fall 2019. Originally designed for podcasts with the name Talkshow, the app was rebranded as "Clubhouse" and officially released for the iOS operating system in March 2020 and as of May 2021 the Android systems as well. Clubhouse was valued at $100 million after receiving funding from notable angel investors. These investors included Ryan Hoover (Founder, Product Hunt), Balaji Srinivasan (Former CTO, Coinbase), James Beshara (Co-Founder, Tilt.com), and several venture capitalists, including a $12 million Series A investment from the venture capital firm, Andreessen Horowitz, in May 2020.

The app gained popularity in the early months of the COVID-19 pandemic. It had 600,000 registered users by December 2020. In January 2021, CEO Paul Davison announced that the active weekly user base on the app consisted of approximately 2 million individuals. The company announced that it would start working on an Android version of the app. In that month, the app became widely used in Germany when German podcast hosts Philipp Klöckner and Philipp Gloeckler began an invite-chain over a Telegram group. It brought German influencers, journalists, and politicians to the platform. Clubhouse raised their Series B at a $1 billion valuation.

On February 1, 2021, Clubhouse had an estimated 3.5 million downloads on a global level which grew rapidly to 8.1 million downloads by February 15. This significant growth in popularity was because celebrities such as Elon Musk and Mark Zuckerberg made appearances on the app. In the same month, Clubhouse hired an Android Software Developer. A year after the app's release, the number of weekly active users was greater than 10 million, but the user base declined 21% during three weeks from late February to early March. This decline was reportedly caused by a decrease in the number of Clubhouse users after its initial release. During its initial roll out, the app was accessible only by invitation, and invitation codes on eBay were selling at up to $400.

On April 5, 2021, Clubhouse partnered with Stripe to launch its first monetizing feature called Clubhouse Payments. Although testing began with only 1,000 users, after a week, the company rolled out the functionality to another 60,000 or more users in the US. In the same month, Twitter entered in discussions to purchase Clubhouse for $4 billion. The talks ended with no acquisition. Later, the company raised their Series C round of funding at a $4 billion valuation. The app also received interest in a partnership, with the National Football League announcing a content deal that month; Twitter Spaces later poached Clubhouse's exclusive NFL deal with 20 official NFL Spaces scheduled for the 2021-22 season.

Finally, On May 9, 2021, Clubhouse launched a beta version of the Android app for users in the US, and on May 21, 2021, Clubhouse became available worldwide for Android users.

In July 2021, Clubhouse announced a partnership with TED to offer exclusive talks. and on July 21, 2021, the company discarded its invitation system and made the application available to all, though a wait list for registration was still applied in order to manage new traffic. As of the time of the announcement, the company stated it had 10 million users on the wait list. On September 23, 2021, the company announced a new feature named "Wave". In October 2021, Clubhouse rolled out new features called "Replays and Clips".

In April 2023, the company announced it was reducing its staff by half amid a "resetting" due to post-pandemic market shifts.

== Features ==
=== Rooms ===
The primary feature of Clubhouse is real-time virtual "rooms" in which users can communicate with each other via audio. Rooms are divided into different categories based on levels of privacy. Moderator roles are denoted by a green star that appears next to the user's name. When a user joins a room, they are initially assigned to the role of a "listener" and cannot unmute themselves. Listeners can notify the moderators of their intent to join the stage and speak by clicking on the "raise hand" icon. Users who are invited to the stage become "speakers" and can unmute themselves. Users can exit a room by tapping the "leave quietly" button or with the help of peace sign emoji.

=== Houses ===
In August 2022, Clubhouse announced a feature called Houses, an invite-based version of the rooms.

=== Events ===
Many conversations in Clubhouse are spontaneous. However, users can schedule conversations by creating an event. While scheduling an event, a user first names the event then set the date and time when the conversation will begin. A Users can add co-hosts to help moderate the event. Once the event has been created, it is added to the Clubhouse bulletin. The bulletin shows upcoming scheduled events and allows users to set notifications for events. A user can see the bulletin by clicking on the calendar icon at the top of the home page

=== Clubs ===
At the Clubhouse, clubs are user communities that regularly discuss a common interest. Many clubs are present in Clubhouse which represents a wide array of topics. Users can find clubs by name under the search tab. A club consists of three categories of users: "Admin", "Leader", and "Member". Members can create private rooms and invite more users into the club. Leaders have all the privileges of a member. Apart from that, they are authorized to create/schedule club-branded open rooms. An admin can modify club settings, add/delete users, change user privileges and create/schedule any type of room. There are three types of clubs: "Open", "By Approval", and "Closed" for membership. Any user can join an open club by pressing the "Join The Club" button on the club profile. In case of approval, users need to apply and wait for membership by clicking the "Apply To Join" button on the club profile. The admins of the respective club are privileged to accept or reject the user's request. In a closed club, membership is limited to users selected by the club admin. All users of a club will be notified when a public room within the club is created. The club creation is restricted to active users and whoever creates the club will become the club admin. Eligible users can create a club by going to their profile, press the "+" sign present in the "Member of" section. Clubs in which a user is a member are shown on their profile page. The first club to half a million members was the Human Behavior Club founded by The Digital Doctor (Dr. Sohaib Imtiaz).

=== Backchannel ===
Backchannel is the messaging function which allows users to interact individually or within a group via text. The Backchannel feature was initially leaked on June 18, 2021, in response to the launch of Spotify Greenroom. This is notable step because, until this point, Clubhouse was voice only with no way to hyperlink or message. It was entirely dependent on Instagram and Twitter for text messaging. The feature was initially leaked in the App Store, which the company says was an accident on Twitter. A month later, after multiple failed attempts, the Clubhouse Backchannel finally launched on July 14, 2021.

=== Explore ===
The homepage of Clubhouse provides access to ongoing chat rooms, which are recommended based on the people and clubs that are followed by the user. As the users tap on the magnifying glass icon, they will be redirected to the explore page. On that page, users can search for people and clubs to follow and also find conversations categorized by topics.

=== Clubhouse payments ===
The app provides a direct payment service provided by the app, which allows users to send money to content creators. It includes those users who had enabled this functionality in their profile. Money can be sent from users to the creator by clicking on their profile. Press "Send Money" then enter the amount you want to send. When a user does this for the first time, they'll be prompted to register a credit or a debit card. The total received amount will go to the creator. The user will also be charged a small card processing fee as per the Clubhouse's payment processing partner, Stripe.

=== Creator First ===
Clubhouse Creator First is an accelerator program that is intended to help content creators on Clubhouse build their audience and monetize their content with a direct payment system. Creator First paid $5,000 a month to 24 creator shows over 3 months.

=== Icon ===
The Clubhouse app icon is a regularly changing grayscale profile photo of a social change leader and platform users. This is unique in app development because most companies hire a designer to create an icon, whereas Clubhouse harvests user photos instead.

==== Notable list of Clubhouse app icons ====
- May 2021 to June 2021 - Drue Kataoka
- February 2021 to May 2021 - Axel Mansoor
- December 2020 to February 2021 - Bomani X

=== Wave ===
This functionality allows users to notify others that they are available for a private chat. It was implemented as a way to provide a less scheduled and more personal experience on the app.

=== Recording ===
This feature let creators record entire conversations or 30-second clips. These recordings can be shared off-platform. The company hoped this would encourage more growth.

== Platforms ==
Clubhouse app is available on Android as of May 2021 and iOS platforms since launch. Users can download the App from their respective stores. The Android customer requires Android 7 or above to launch the app. iOS consumers need iOS 13 or later to run the app.

Pierre Stanislas and Philippe Breuils have developed a free third-party desktop client (Mac and Windows) for Clubhouse, called Clubdeck. This app is noteworthy because it provides multiple features not available in the official Clubhouse app, including the ability to add a soundboard to your rooms.

== Technical ==
The Clubhouse Android app is written in Kotlin while the iOS app is written in React Native. The app's backend is written in Python and Django. It runs on a Gunicorn server with HAProxy for load balancing.

== Business model ==
Presently Clubhouse operates on the funds supplied by its investors. The company intends to monetize the platform via tips, paid events, subscriptions, and connecting creators with different brand partners.

In April 2021, tipping was rolled out to select users in the United States. The company promised sponsorships to its Creator First shows, but only 3 of the 23 selected shows landed a sponsor, and out of them there is only one that is reportedly tied to the program.

Two Clubhouse personalities were signed by Endeavor to talent representation contracts: Nait Jones and NYU Girls Roasting Tech Guys.

Other social audio apps like Discord Stage Channels, Facebook Live Audio Rooms, Reddit Talk, Fanbase, Slack Huddles, Spotify Greenroom, Telegram Voice Chats, and Twitter Spaces all directly compete with Clubhouse.

== Criticism ==
=== Privacy ===
Clubhouse records audio in the virtual rooms to support incident investigations. When a discussion is reported of violating Clubhouse's rules, the audio of the associated room will be reviewed by staff. In the absence of a report, the room's recording is automatically deleted when the session ends. Clubhouse does not explicitly explain the review process.

In April 2021, an SQL database with 1.3 million Clubhouse user records was published on a hacker forum. It contained real names, social media usernames, and other account information. Clubhouse issued a statement on the incident on social media, stating that they did not experience a breach of their systems. The company stated that the data is already accessible to the public and can be accessed by anyone through their application or API.

=== Censorship ===
In February 2021, China banned Clubhouse. Before the ban, Clubhouse attracted a significant amount of Chinese users to discuss various topics. This included politically sensitive topics, such as protests in Hong Kong and the political status of Taiwan, which became the main reason for the ban. In early March 2021, the UAE reportedly throttled access to the app, making access in the country impossible. Later, mid-month, Oman blocked Clubhouse for not having a proper license to operate. Jordan also blocked the app for conducting sensitive conversations late that month.

=== Controversy ===
The Clubhouse Guidelines forbid the recording, transcription, reproduction, or sharing of conversations without explicit permission. This has been a source of controversy as cases of bullying, harassment, and racism, such as antisemitism, have occurred on the app. Numerous incidents of antisemitism have been reported.

=== Hate rallies ===
Clubhouse is known to harbor various hate rallies, including those spreading antisemitism, Islamophobia, Hinduphobia, and incel ideology. In May 2021, actor LaKeith Stanfield found himself moderating a room where some users shared antisemitic viewpoints. Complaints were also made in September 2020 and April 2021. Following her anti-Muslim remarks in a room hosted by a PR consultant, far-right Internet personality Laura Loomer was suspended for Islamophobia.

== See also ==
- Spoon Radio
- Zello
