= Spotify Live =

Defunct social audio service

- Screenshot of Spotify Live version 3.3.3, running on iOS 16
- Developer: Betty Labs Incorporated
- Initial release: October 2020; 5 years ago

Final release(s)
- Android: 2.0.78 / April 3, 2023; 2 years ago
- iOS: 4.2.3 / March 27, 2023; 2 years ago
- Operating system: Android 8 or above; iOS 13 or above
- Available in: English
- Type: Voice over IP (VoIP)
- License: Freeware
- Website: www.spotify.com/us/greenroom/

Spotify Live, formerly Spotify Greenroom, was a social audio app by Spotify, that allowed users to host or participate in live-audio virtual environments called "room" for conversations. Each room had a maximum capacity of 1000 people. The app was available on Android and iOS, competing with Twitter Spaces and Clubhouse in the social media segment. It was shut down on April 30, 2023.

== History ==
In October 2020, Betty Labs released Locker Room exclusively on the iOS App Store. The app featured virtual audio chat rooms for sports enthusiasts. In late March 2021, Spotify acquired Betty Labs for $50 million and announced plans to rebrand the app with a broader focus on sports, music, and pop culture. On June 16, 2021, Spotify launched the app as Spotify Greenroom on Android (early access) and iOS, expanding its scope beyond just sports.

At launch, Spotify introduced the Greenroom Creator Fund to support creators and shows, serving as a rival to Clubhouse's Creator First Accelerator Program. The fund aimed to provide a monetization path for podcasters integrating Greenroom into their verified Spotify accounts.

By July 2021, the app had accumulated over 140,000 iOS installs and 100,000 Android installs. In August 2021, Spotify collaborated with the WWE to produce professional wrestling-related podcasts, many of which would be recorded by The Ringer, Spotify's in-house podcasting team, using Greenroom.

In March 2022, Spotify Greenroom announced its rebranding as Spotify Live and its migration to the main Spotify app. After a year, Spotify announced it would shut down the Spotify Live app at the end of April 2023.

== Features ==
Greenroom allowed users to create or join a room, which, in the context of the application, was a virtual space for real-time voice chats. Users could only create a room within a pre-defined group, representing either a brand or a generic category. If a user chose to create a room, they became the host, with the ability to invite people, control who could talk, and enable features like recording and the Discussions tab during room creation. Enabling recording displayed a disclaimer informing users that the conversation was being recorded, and the audio, recorded in mp4 format, would be sent to the host via email after the room concluded.

If the Discussions tab was enabled, users could send text messages in the public chat section. The host also had the authority to ban users if necessary. When joining a room, a user could opt to be a listener or request to become a speaker. Users had the freedom to follow or block others and join groups at their discretion. Notifications about new rooms in joined groups would be sent to users. Additionally, users could discover new individuals and groups using the search tab.

== Partnered creators ==
By October 2021, Spotify had a variety of partnered creators aimed at boosting traffic and validating its vertically integrated podcast model. These creators primarily focused on Generation Z. In-house Spotify talent, such as The Ringer, produced sports-related content. Simultaneously, the company recruited creators from various social channels to grow Greenroom's audience while also promoting its integration with Spotify and Anchor. Each verified Spotify partner had their Greenroom shows featured in both the Greenroom app and their profiles on the Spotify app. This was part of the company's strategy leading into the 2022 ramp-up to compete with Clubhouse.

== Platforms ==
The app was accessible on both Android and iOS platforms, and users could download the app from their respective app stores. Android users needed Android 8 or above to launch the app, while iOS consumers required iOS 13 or later to run it.
