= Spoonman (disambiguation) =

"Spoonman" is a song by the American rock band Soundgarden

It can also refer to:

- Artis the Spoonman, an American musician and street performer
- The Spoonman, an Australian radio program
- "Spoonman", a song by Underworld from the 1994 album dubnobasswithmyheadman

== See also ==
- Spoon (disambiguation)
- Spoony (disambiguation)
- Spoon (musical instrument)
