= Crip Up the Kitchen =

Cookbook written by Jules Sherred

Crip Up the Kitchen: Tools, Tips and Recipes for the Disabled Cook
- Author: Jules Sherred
- Illustrator: Jules Sherred
- Language: English
- Genre: Cookbook
- Published: 2023 (TouchWood Editions)
- Publisher: TouchWood Editions
- Publication date: May 9, 2023
- Publication place: Canada
- Media type: Print
- Pages: 272
- ISBN: 978-1-77151-396-8

Crip Up the Kitchen: Tools, Tips and Recipes for the Disabled Cook is a 2023 cookbook written and photographed by disabled Canadian writer, advocate, food photographer and food stylist, Jules Sherred.

== Contents ==
A reference book, the cookbook is focused on equipping and managing the kitchen in a way that centres disabled and neurodivergent cooks. Heavily influenced by the "Spoon Theory,” the book explains how to manage the cooking process safely and efficiently without depleting all your energy. Sherred's recipes were developed with the disabled and neurodivergent cook in mind and makes use of three key tools: the electric pressure cooker, air fryer, and bread machine. Sherred also recommends other tools to help manage the cooking process.

Split into two halves, the first focuses on equipping and managing the kitchen. It includes information on everything from organizing the kitchen, pantry preparation and meal planning to instructions for how to create recipes for the electric pressure cooker and air fryer, and food storage techniques. The second half consists of 50 recipes sorted by how much energy it takes to prepare them. The recipes include information for substitutions and variations to accommodate a variety of diets, with complete nutritional information. The appendix has an outline for stocking the pantry for surgery recovery.

The way the recipes are written are a departure from how recipes are typically presented. The most notable departures are the inclusion of equipment lists, both metric and imperial measurements in the ingredient lists, and the way the instructions are broken down so that they don't hide multiple steps in one. These departures were created for neurodivergent cooks after identifying common points of failure in the cooking process and creating solutions to help mitigate them.

== History ==
Sherred started working on the book in 2020, a few months into the COVID-19 pandemic. Being disabled and chronically ill, he said:

Those of us who have chronic illnesses knew that it would become a mass disabling event. People waiting for surgeries, including myself, were having them delayed and having difficulty managing our needs, like cooking. More people were discovering they are neurodivergent because of a rapid change in circumstances that drastically changed their routines. I knew a lot of people would benefit from my knowledge, especially as there was nothing like it available.

Overall, Sherred worked on the book for just over two years. The seeds of the content were first developed on his food blog Disabled Kitchen and Garden, which he began in January 2019. The proposal was prepared in the summer of 2020 and queried the finished proposal in the fall of 2020. He took a break during the winter of 2020 and spring of 2021 to recover from three surgeries. He resumed querying at the end of the summer of 2021. He sold his book in the fall of 2021. He finished the manuscript and photography during the first four months of 2022. It went to print in November 2022, a year after signing his contract.
