= Spoons =

Spoons may refer to:

== Film and TV ==
- Spoons (TV series), a 2005 UK comedy sketch show
- Spoons (Gobots), a fictional character
- Spoons, a minor character from The Sopranos

== Music ==
- Spoons (band), a Canadian new wave synth-pop band
- Spoons (musical instrument)
- Spoons (album), 2007 debut album of Wallis Bird
- "Spoons", a track from the 2002 album Mali Music by Damon Albarn

== Other uses ==
- Spoons (card game), the card game of Donkey, but using spoons
- Spoons sex position
- Spoons, common abbreviation for Wetherspoons, a UK chain of pubs
- Spoon theory, an allegory using spoons to represent the amount of physical or mental energy one has

== See also ==
- Spoon, a utensil commonly used with soup
- Spoon (disambiguation)
