= Wakie =

- Original authors: Hrachik Ajamian; Tatul Ajamian
- Developer: Wakie
- Initial release: 2011
- Operating system: Android, iOS
- Platform: Mobile app
- Type: Social networking service, Social audio
- License: Proprietary
- Website: wakie.com

Wakie is a mobile social networking app which facilitates voice-based interactions between users who are strangers. It is headquartered in San Francisco.

== History ==
=== Early history (2011–2014) ===
Wakie was originally founded in 2011 as Budist by brothers Hrachik and Tatul Ajamian. The original concept focused on transforming the traditional alarm clock into a social experience by allowing users to volunteer to wake others through scheduled phone calls. It received early seed funding from a group of business angels, including a grant from technology investors Yuri Milner and Pavel Durov. In 2012, it raised a $2 million seed round from Leta Capital.

=== Wakie (2014–present) ===
In 2014, the service was renamed as Wakie and launched mobile apps for Android and iOS. By early 2015, the platform had 1.5 million users. In the same year, Wakie joined the Y Combinator accelerator program and shifted its focus from a social alarm service to a voice-based social conversation platform.

== App ==
Wakie connects users for one-on-one or group voice conversations based on personal interests and preferences rather than appearance. While the app uses machine learning algorithms to pair users based on user profiles, interests, and feedback ratings, it still allows users to manually select whom they want to talk to. Additional features include a public text feed, the ability to follow other users, and themed rooms for group voice discussions. While the platform initially gained attention for its alarm clock feature, its current focus is on general social interaction and peer-to-peer communication.

== Reception ==
During its period as a social alarm clock app, Wakie received coverage for replacing an alarm tone with a one-minute phone call from a stranger. The Next Web described the app as matching "sleepies" with "wakies" while keeping phone numbers hidden, and noted that users had to sign in with a phone number. Entrepreneur framed the idea as either a "serendipitous" morning ritual or a "potentially terrifying" social tool. CNN likewise wrote that if being awakened by a stranger sounded "creepy or disconcerting", Wakie might not be for that user, while noting that the app hid users' phone numbers and limited calls to one minute. Rhodri Marsden of The Independent said he deleted Wakie before using it, describing the idea of forced morning small talk with a stranger as "excruciating" and arguing that such apps valued novelty over usefulness. In a week-long trial for The Daily Telegraph, Sarah Rainey found the service unreliable and uncomfortable: some wake-up calls failed, one call was silent and unsettling, another involved loud music, and one caller became lewd. She concluded that Wakie felt less like a helpful alarm clock than a "dodgy answering service" for strange or leering men.

Several reviewers raised concerns about privacy, anonymity, and harassment. Leah Yamshon of Macworld wrote that Wakie hid phone numbers but was "not completely anonymous," because users could see the caller's country and could try to find people afterward through the app's Community section. Yamshon also noted that the app asked users to connect via Facebook and link a phone number, and said that although most of her interactions were tame, one caller "trolled" her and another became "a little fresh"; she concluded that Wakie was an interesting social experiment but that she would keep using the iPhone's default alarm. Fast Company similarly found the service intriguing but warned that calls from strangers carried "special creepy baggage," citing the need for privacy controls, anonymous ratings, and moderation as the app grew.

Other reviewers were more mixed or cautiously positive. Alicia Lu of Bustle called Wakie awkward but potentially effective, while warning that a platform built around calls from strangers could easily be misused for prank calls or inappropriate comments. Chris Carter of Paste gave the app a positive-leaning review score of 7.6, saying the idea worked as advertised, but also criticized the privacy tradeoff of requiring either a phone number or Facebook login and said that sharing a phone number with a company in an era of insecure data was risky.
