= Spoony =

Spoony may refer to:

- DJ Spoony, British DJ
- Brian Carlton (born 1962), host of Australian radio show The Spoonman, who used the aliases "Spoonman" and "Spoony"
- Mark Cross (musician), who used the stage name "Spoony"; former drummer of the German band At Vance
- Noah Antwiler, also known as "Spoony", whose review webseries The Spoony Experiment was hosted on Channel Awesome
- Paddlefish, a species of fish also known as "spoonbills" or "spoonies"

== See also ==
- Spoon (disambiguation)
- Spoonman (disambiguation)
