= Spooning (disambiguation) =

Spooning is a cuddling or sex position, with the front of one person's body against the back of another's.

Spooning also may refer to:

- Use of ceramic spoons in traditional Chinese medical discipline Gua Sha
- Spooning (croquet), ball-handling technique
- Choreic hand, also known as spooning, a posture significant in medical diagnoses

== See also ==
- Spoon (disambiguation)
