= Spoon (disambiguation) =

A spoon is an eating or cooking implement, consisting of a small oval or round shallow bowl with a handle.

Spoon may also refer to:

== Sport ==
- Spoon (golf), a wooden golf club, equivalent to a 3 wood
- Spoon Inc., Japanese motorsports equipment manufacturer
- Spoon lure, a fishing lure shaped like the bowl of a spoon
- Spoon oar (sport rowing), one with a curved blade

== Music ==
- Spoon (musical instrument)
- Spoon Records, an independent label
- Spoon (band), an indie rock band from the U.S. city of Austin, Texas
- Spoon (album), by Akina Nakamori, 1998
- "Spoon" (Can song), 1972
- "Spoon" (Dave Matthews Band song), 1998
- "Spoon", a Cibo Matto song

== People ==
- Spoon Jackson (born 1957), American murderer and poet
- "Spoon" Will Witherspoon (born 1980), American football player
- Brandon Spoon (born 1978), American former National Football League player
- Dave Spoon (born 1977), BBC radio disc jockey and dance music producer
- Rae Spoon, Canadian folk/indie singer and songwriter
- Jake Spoon, fictional Texas Ranger in two Lonesome Dove novels

== Other uses ==
- Tablespoon and teaspoon, common measuring units based on the respective type of spoon
- Spoon theory, a disability metaphor used to explain the reduced amount of energy available for activities of daily living and productive tasks that may result from disability or chronic illness
- Spoon (liturgy), in Eastern Orthodox religion
- Spoon River, in the U.S. state of Illinois
- Spoon (TV program), a Philippine cooking talk show
- "The Spoon", a 2011 episode of The Amazing World of Gumball
- "Spoon", an episode of The Protector
- Echiura or spoon worms, a small group of marine animals
- "Spoon" is also used as a short form of Spoon Radio, a South Korean audio-only live streaming platform
- Pulsar Spoon, a line of retro styled watches by Pulsar (watch)
- Spoon, the former name for Turbo (software), a set of software products and products from Code Systems Corporation
- "Spoon", the Wooden Spoon Society charity

== See also ==
- Spooning (disambiguation)
- Spoons (disambiguation)
