= FlockDB =

Graph-based distributed data manager, project no longer maintained since 2012

- Original authors: Nick Kallen, Robey Pointer, John Kalucki and Ed Ceaser from Twitter
- Developer: Twitter
- Initial release: April 2010
- Final release: 1.8.5 / 23 February 2012; 14 years ago
- Written in: Scala, Java, Ruby
- Type: Graph Database
- License: Apache License 2.0
- Website: github.com/twitter/flockdb
- Repository: github.com/twitter/flockdb

FlockDB was an open-source distributed, fault-tolerant graph database for managing wide but shallow network graphs. It was initially used by Twitter to store relationships between users, e.g. followings and favorites. FlockDB differs from other graph databases, e.g. Neo4j in that it was not designed for multi-hop graph traversal but rather for rapid set operations, not unlike the primary use-case for Redis sets. FlockDB was posted on GitHub shortly after Twitter released its Gizzard framework, which it used to query the FlockDB distributed datastore. The database is licensed under the Apache License.

Twitter no longer supports FlockDB.

== See also ==
- Gizzard (Scala framework)
