= X Corp. v. Operation Bluebird =

Trademark dispute over the name "Twitter"

X Corp. v. Operation Bluebird, Inc.
- The bird logo (left) (Twitter and the former Twitter, Inc.) and the typographical logo (right) (X Corp. and X social network)

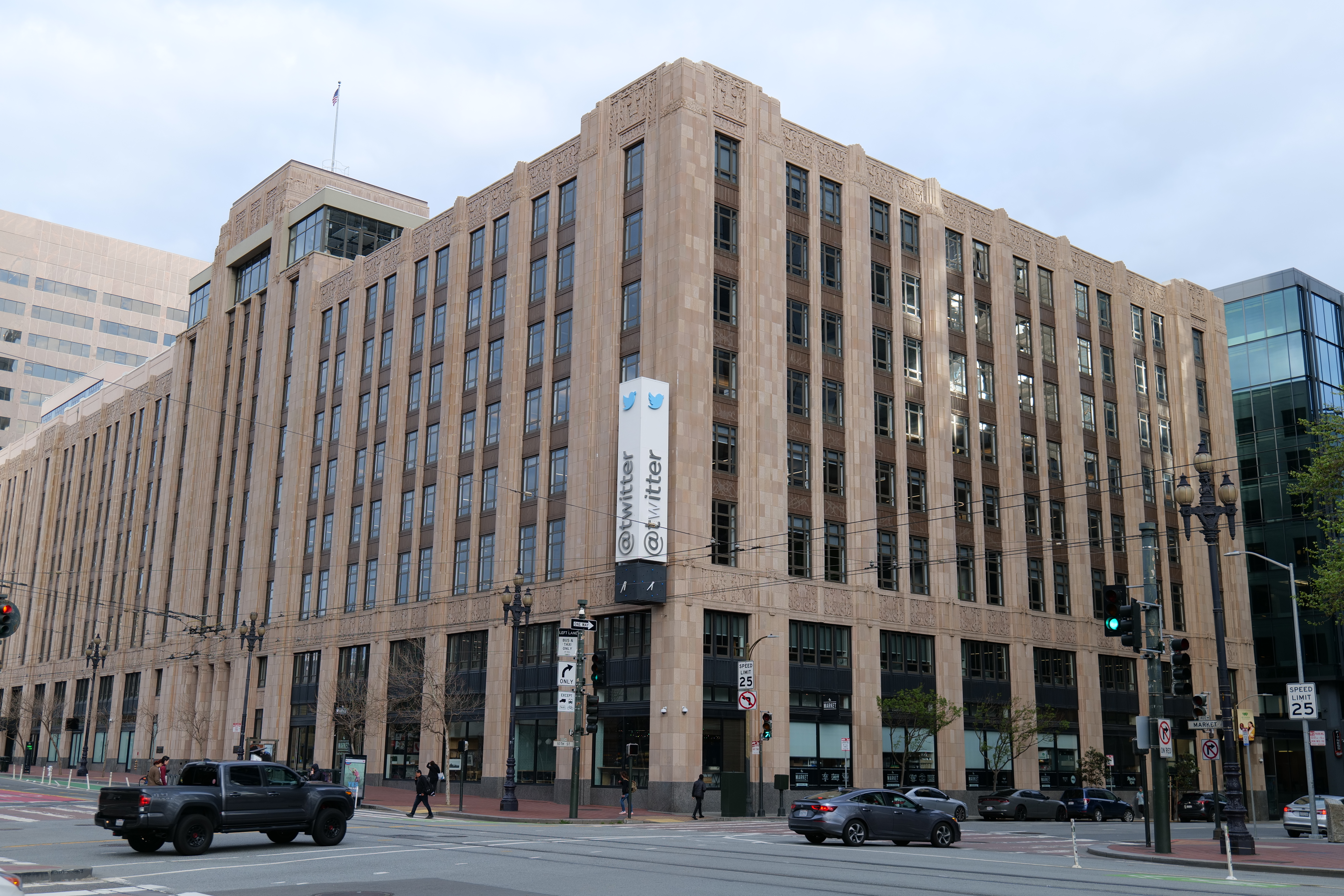
- Prior to the rebrand from Twitter to X and relocating in Texas, the former Twitter, Inc. was located in San Francisco.

Trademark abandonment dispute status:

Cancellation proceeding status: Ongoing (since 2 December 2025 to present)

Court trial status: Ongoing (since 16 December 2025 to present)

X Corp. v. Operation Bluebird, also known as the Twitter trademark dispute is a legal dispute in the United States concerning the ownership and continued validity of the Twitter trademark following the rebranding of the social media platform Twitter to X in 2023. The case involves X Corp., the company that owns and operates the platform X, formerly known as "Twitter", and Operation Bluebird, a startup seeking to launch a new social media service using the name "Twitter".

The dispute centers on whether the "Twitter" trademark was effectively abandoned after the rebranding, and whether another company may legally register or use the name.

== Background ==
In July 2023, X Corp., owned by entrepreneur Elon Musk, rebranded the social media platform Twitter as X. The rebranding included the removal of the well-known bird logo, the replacement of the domain name twitter.com with x.com, and the gradual elimination of terminology such as "tweet" and "retweet" from the platform's branding. A 2023 post said that the company was ready to "bid adieu to the Twitter brand and, gradually, all the birds".

In 2025, the startup Operation Bluebird announced plans to launch a new social networking service under the name twitter.new. The company also filed a petition with the United States Patent and Trademark Office (USPTO) seeking cancellation of several Twitter-related trademarks, and a new "Twitter" trademark for itself. Operation Bluebird argued that X Corp. had abandoned the trademarks by ceasing active commercial use of the brand. The petition was filed by Stephen Coates, who used to work as a trademark lawyer for Twitter, and now works for Operation Bluebird.

In the process from 2023-2024 due to the rebrand from Twitter to X and transition from Twitter, Inc. to X Corp., the former headquarters were stripped of iconic Twitter trademarks, marking the disestablishment of Twitter, Inc. and the establishment of X Corp., which is now located in Bastrop, Texas.

X Corp. updated X's terms of service as a result of the case. It now says that X and Twitter's names, logos, domain names, and other distinctive features can not be used by others without permission; formerly it only mentioned X.

== Legal claims ==
Operation Bluebird argued that the rebranding of Twitter to X constituted trademark abandonment under U.S. trademark law. According to the company, the removal of the Twitter name, logos, and terminology from the platform demonstrated an intent to discontinue use of the mark.

X Corp. rejected these claims and filed legal action against Operation Bluebird. The company argued that the Twitter trademarks remained valid and enforceable, and that the attempt to use the name by another company constituted trademark infringement.

X Corp. further stated that the Twitter brand remains historically associated with its platform, that the trademarks were not relinquished despite the rebranding, and that it would cause consumer confusion.

== Establishment of Twitter.now (rebranded as Tweet.app) ==
Twitter.now, later rebranded as Tweet.app in September 2026, is a new social media platform, features an automated artificial intelligence (AI) system named as VERA along with the Trust OS to detect misinformation and fake news. It also revives the use of the blue bird logo that is considered iconic. They also refer to posts, as "tweets", again under the premise that Twitter abandoned the trademark following its disuse and removal from the X platform. As of September 2026, Tweet.app is in development mode with paid reservation tiers such as "founding member" now having early access to the site.

According to Operation Bluebird, the reason they rebranded from Twitter.now to Tweet.app is the ownership of the name "Twitter" is claimed by X Corp. and thus Operation Bluebird cannot use the name of Twitter, unless X Corp. loses their suit and has to comply with a ruling to hand over the name "Twitter".

== Startup establishment ==
The startup was founded by Stephen Coates and Michael Peroff along with Kevin Raper, Rick Baker, Durk Barnhill and Jeff Brooks to reclaim "Twitter" and the original trademarks such as the iconic blue bird logo, terms that are unique to "Twitter" such as "Tweets", "Tweep", "Twitterati", the name and old icons, however they are facing challenges to own them without serious consequences, especially from Elon Musk and X Corp. If the complete abandonment was proven by courts, then they may have the right to own the original trademarks but it is still difficult for them to own these trademarks without proof according by courts. Rather than copying the original "Twitter", they are focused on defending their own rights to reclaim "Twitter" while also cannot use the name "Twitter" until likely taking for more years to settle the dispute between them and X Corp.

Currently, they are focused on developing their own platform for mobile devices on Android, iOS and in the future, iPadOS as well their plans focusing on user registration and signing in, specific feature designed for customers to put the code in, scanning QR code and communicate using tweets for local businesses. They call communities on the platform as "Nests" to be unique term rather than just "Communities".

== Analysis ==
Josh Gerben, a trademark attorney based on Washington DC, who has been following the case, considered it very unlikely for Operation Bluebird to win the case. He pointed out that popular recognition still associates the "Twitter" brand with X Corp.. He also pointed out that there were no similar precedents of a company dissociating itself from such a big brand.

== See also ==
- Trademark law in the United States
- Trademark abandonment
- Criticism of the rebrand from Twitter to X
- Twitter under Elon Musk
- Acquisition of Twitter by Elon Musk
- Twitter/X
- Twitter, Inc.
- X Corp.
