= Spoon Radio =

Social digital audio live streaming

Spoon
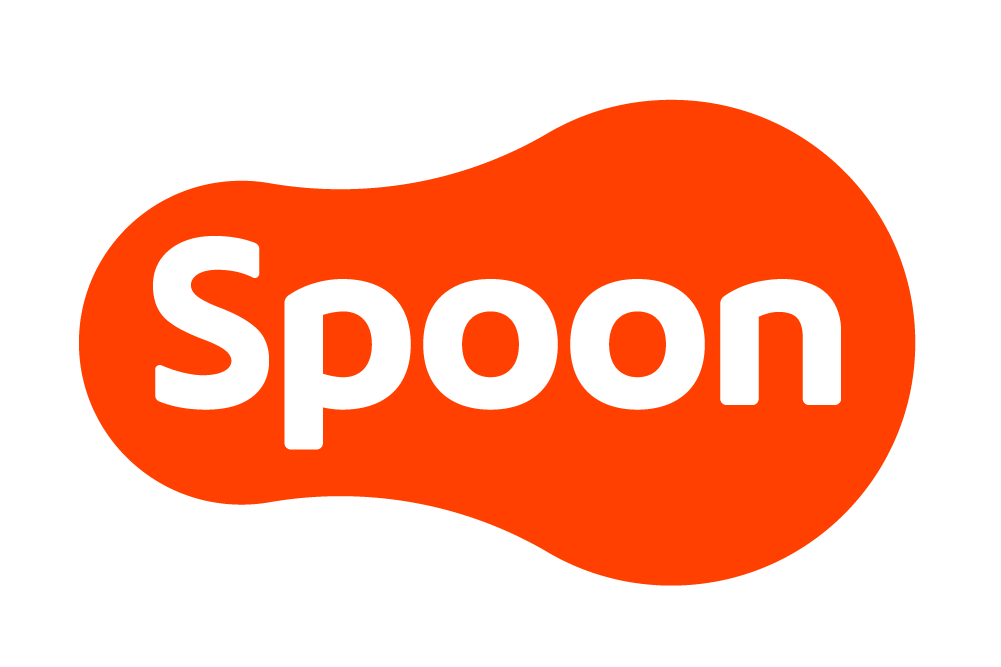
- Original author(s): Neil Choi, Hyuk jun Choi, Hee-jae Lee
- Developer(s): Spoon Radio Inc.
- Initial release: March 2016; 9 years ago
- Operating system: iOS, Android, Web
- Available in: 4 languages
- List of languages English, Korean, Japanese, Arabic
- Type: Internet radio; Audio streaming service
- Website: www.spooncast.net

Spoon is a social digital audio live streaming service. It is developed by Spoon Radio Inc., a South Korea-based company with a US office located in San Francisco, California. It allows users to listen to streamers and even start their own live streams using their smartphones and web, without any other equipment. It provides services in four languages, including South Korea, Japan, and Middle Eastern and North African regions.

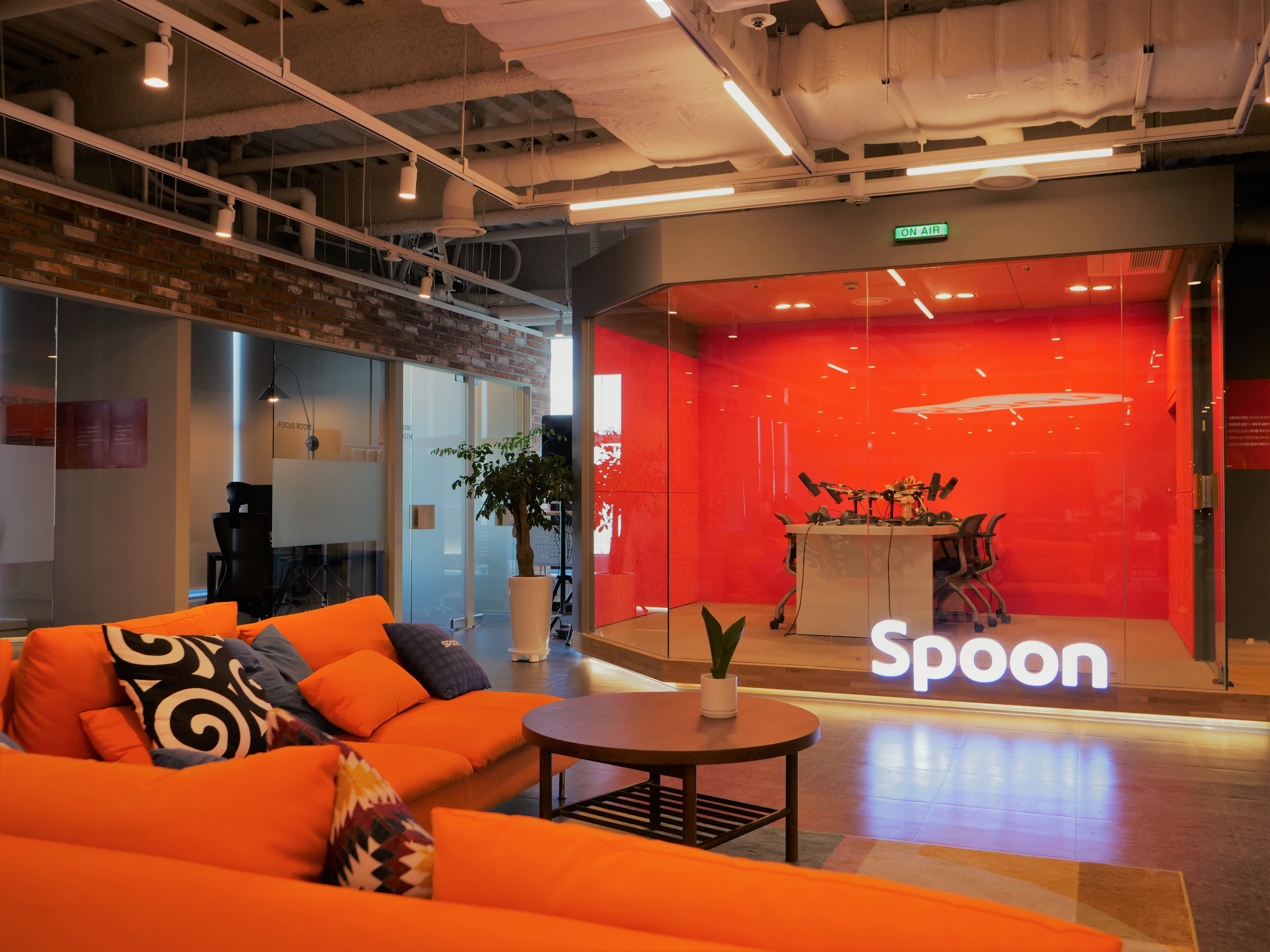
Spoon Office

== History ==
CEO Neil Choi, together with founders Hyuk Jun Choi and Hee-jae Lee, started their company Mykoon in 2013 with Plugger, a smartphone battery sharing service. They created Spoon Radio as their flagship on March 23, 2016. Two years since its inception, it got its backing in Series B funding from investors – namely Softbank Ventures Asia, KB Investment (KBIC), and Goodwater Capital – wherein they invested a total of $17 million. As part of its global expansion effort, Spoon has also hired Fernando Pizarro, media and internet executive from Disney, Discovery Communications and Yahoo!, as vice president.

== Reception ==
By August 2018, the application has generated net revenue that surpassed more than $20 million, becoming the most famous audio-only streaming service in South Korea. Popular among the youth between ages 18 to 24 years old, Spoon has been downloaded 2.5 million times daily and there have been millions of broadcast uploads. It has expanded to Japan, US, and to different countries. In 2019, it has generated net revenue of $41 million.

== Features ==
Spoon is an internet-radio broadcasting mobile application which allows its users to stream through audio alone, hence the catchphrase "live stream without a camera". Listeners can give their favorite streamers digital gifts called "Spoons" which then can be redeemed for money. There is a Live Call feature which lets streamers invite other streamers or even their listeners to co-host the stream with them.

- Live

Live-streaming is Spoon's most definitive feature. Users can start live broadcasting by simply setting the title and a background image within the app or web. The host, or the "streamer," can interact with the listeners through text-based chats or audio-based live streams.

- Podcast

Podcast is pre-recorded content. Spoon currently allows its users to either upload a pre-recorded audio file as podcasts or save live streams.

- Talk

In Talk, users post short discussion topics and can post comments using their voice. At the moment, Talk is only available in the app version.

- Live Call

At the moment, Spoon allows for a call between a streamer and up to four of their listeners. The streamer, when setting up a live stream, must enable this feature before the live stream begins. The listeners can then call in via clicking the phone icon on the screen. The streamer can then choose which "call" to pick up - and, should the need arise, terminate the call at will.

- Voice profile

The Voice profile is where users can upload a short clip of their voices. Other users can come to the profile and rate the voice by over 14 different voice types (Sweet, Cute, Flirty, Scary, Soft, Warm, Gentle, Cool, Funny, Friendly, Husky, Powerful, Tough, Romantic).

== Originals ==
Apart from user-created content, Spoon also offers Originals, where the contents are done by celebrities or professionals in the entertainment industry.

== See also ==
- Musical.ly
- Clubhouse (app)
