= Social audio =

Audio-based group chat services

Social audio is a subclass of social media that designates social media platforms that use audio as their primary channel of communication. This can include text messages, podcasts, tools for recording and editing audio in addition to virtual audio rooms.

== History ==
In March 2020, Alpha Exploration Co. launched a social audio application called Clubhouse on the iOS platform. The app has led to the emergence of a new social media segment known as social audio. Soon realizing the potential of this segment, a handful of companies came out with their social audio solutions as standalone products or as an expansion to their current products. Clubhouse being the pioneer in this segment, all competitors eventually adapted its features to their products. Betty Labs launched their social audio app Locker Room for iOS a few months later in October. Twitter then announced in November that it would develop a social audio feature on its platform. In December 2020, Telegram introduced the social audio feature Voice Chats in its app. Within the month, Twitter began beta testing its social audio feature known as Spaces with iOS users on their platform.

Facebook announced plans to add social audio functionality to its app in January 2021, and Twitter started beta testing Spaces with Android users in March. Telegram released Voice Chat 2.0 around the same time. On March 26, 2021, Slack CEO Stewart Butterfield announced that Slack would soon roll out a social audio feature. Spotify then purchased Betty Labs and announced its intention to rename the Locker Room app. On March 31, 2021, Discord introduced its social audio feature called Stage Channels. In April, Facebook launched a social audio product called Hotline in closed beta, requiring a Twitter account to login. Reddit also announced a social audio feature, known as Reddit Talk.

On May 3, 2021, Twitter Spaces released globally. Clubhouse launched a beta version of the Android app for users in the US on May 9, and worldwide on May 21. On June 16, 2021, Spotify released its social audio app Spotify Greenroom on Android and iOS. On June 21, 2021, Facebook released its social audio feature known as Live Audio Rooms to users based in the United States. The company said it would deploy the feature globally in the coming months. On June 30, 2021, Slack started rolling out its social audio solution named Slack Huddles for paid customers. On July 21, 2021, the Clubhouse beta ended with the launch of a full release.

== Common features ==
- Chat rooms in which users can converse through shared audio recordings, typically in real-time.
- Traditional text and rich-media-based chat.

== List of platforms ==
Telegram Voice Chats

In December 2020, Telegram introduced the social audio feature Voice Chats in its app. Later, in March 2021, Telegram released Voice Chat 2.0. It allows unlimited participants and conversation recording.

Discord Stages

On March 31, 2021, Discord introduced its social audio feature called Stage Channels.

Facebook Live Audio Rooms and Podcasts

In April 2021, The Facebook NPE team launched a product called Hotline in closed beta, requiring a Twitter account to login. It offers a room where only some people can speak while others listen. Also, speakers can turn on video.

On June 21, 2021, Facebook has released its social audio feature known as Live Audio Rooms and Podcasts to users based in the United States. The company said it would deploy the feature globally in the coming months. It enables users to participate in the rooms with a maximum of 51 people (1 host and 50 speakers) onstage and an unlimited number of listeners. Also, provide access to a podcast library for its users.

Reddit Talk

In April 2021, Reddit announced a social audio feature called Reddit Talk for their subreddit communities.

Twitter Spaces

On May 3, 2021, Twitter added a social audio feature named Spaces to its platform. It allows users to engage in rooms with a maximum of 13 people (1 host, 2 co-hosts, and 10 speakers) onstage and an unlimited number of listeners.

Spaces is much further ahead in development than Clubhouse, with integration into the Twitter API that enables app integration. In July 2021, Twitter announced a 'Voice Transformer' feature that would work in Spaces to change your voice. Twitter also poached Clubhouse's exclusive NFL deal with 20 official NFL Spaces scheduled for the 2021-22 season.

Spotify Greenroom

On June 16, 2021, Spotify released its social audio app Spotify Greenroom. Greenroom has built-in recording and integrates into both Spotify and Anchor.fm. This integration allows podcasters to record rooms and upload directly to podcast for distribution. It also notifies Spotify listeners when a verified artist is live in Greenroom. Greenroom can currently accommodate up to 1000 people in a room.

Slack Huddles

On June 30, 2021, Slack started rolling out its social audio solution named Slack Huddles for paid customers. It can take up to 50 participants at a time.
