= X (social network) =

American social networking service

- The account page for Wikipedia on X, May 2026
- Former names: Twttr (2006); Twitter (2006–2023)
- Website type: Social networking service
- Available in: Multilingual
- Founded: March 21, 2006; 20 years ago, in San Francisco, California, U.S.
- Headquarters: Current: Bastrop, Texas; Formerly: Twitter Building (San Francisco, California)
- Area served: Worldwide, except blocking countries
- Owners: Odeo (March–October 2006); Obvious Corporation (2006–2007); Twitter, Inc. (2007–2023); X Corp. (2023–present)
- Founders: Jack Dorsey; Noah Glass; Biz Stone; Evan Williams
- Website: x.com
- Registration: Required (Note: Registration is not required to view individual posts accessed via a direct link (not inclusive of any replies to the post or parent posts to a reply) or to view the top posts of some accounts.)
- Launched: July 15, 2006; 20 years ago
- Native clients on: Web; Android; iOS; iPadOS; Amazon Fire Tablet
- Written in: Scala; Java; Ruby; JavaScript; Python

X, formerly known as Twitter, (Note: Known as Twitter from 2006 until 2023, when the platform was rebranded to X following its acquisition by Elon Musk.) is an American microblogging and social networking service, headquartered in Bastrop, Texas, and owned by X Corp., a subsidiary of SpaceXAI, a subsidiary of the technology company SpaceX. It is one of the world's largest social media platforms and one of the most-visited websites. Users can share short text messages, images, and videos in short posts (previously, commonly and unofficially known as "tweets", in reference to the site's former terminology for the format) and like other users' content. The platform also includes direct messaging, video and audio calling, bookmarks, lists, communities, Grok chatbot integration, job search, and a social audio feature (X Spaces). Users can vote on context added by approved users using the Community Notes feature.

The platform was created in March 2006 by Jack Dorsey, Noah Glass, Biz Stone, and Evan Williams, and was launched in July of that year; initially named twttr, it was renamed Twitter some months later. The platform grew quickly; by 2012 more than 100 million users produced 340 million daily tweets. Twitter, Inc. was based in San Francisco, California, and had more than 25 offices around the world. A signature characteristic of the service initially was that posts were required to be brief. Posts were initially limited to 140 characters, which was changed to 280 characters in 2017. The limitation was removed for subscribed accounts in 2023. 10% of users produce over 80% of tweets. In 2020, it was estimated that approximately 48 million accounts (15% of all accounts) were run by Internet bots rather than humans.

X Corp. was established to succeed the prior owner Twitter, Inc. in March 2023 following the October 2022 acquisition of Twitter by Elon Musk for US$44 billion. Musk stated that his goal with the acquisition was to promote free speech on the platform. Since his acquisition, the platform has been criticized for enabling the increased spread of disinformation and hate speech and accused of becoming increasingly right-wing and catering to hate groups. In February 2026, France raided X offices and fined the platform for failing to remove harmful and illegal content.

Linda Yaccarino succeeded Musk as CEO on June 5, 2023, with Musk remaining as the chairman and the chief technology officer. In July 2023, Musk announced that Twitter would be rebranded to "X" and the bird logo would be retired, a process which was completed by May 2024. In March 2025, X Corp. was acquired by xAI, Musk's artificial intelligence company. The deal, an all-stock transaction, valued X at $33 billion, with a full valuation of $45 billion when factoring in $12 billion in debt. xAI, in turn, was valued at $80 billion. In July 2025, Yaccarino stepped down from her role as CEO. In February 2026, the platform's owner, xAI, was acquired by SpaceX; this marked the sixth time where the social media platform has changed hands and the third time under Musk's ownership.

== History ==
=== 2006–2021 ===
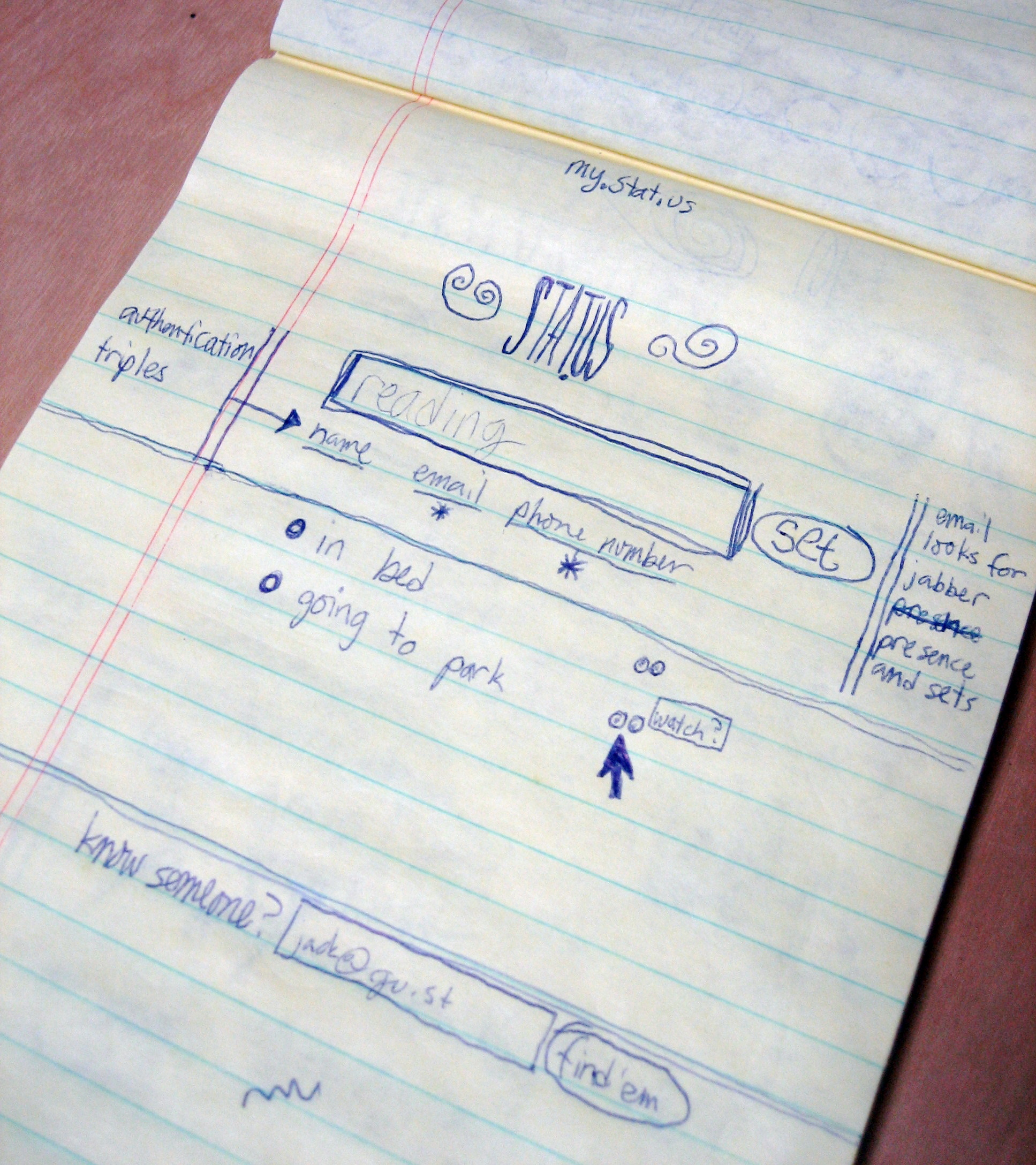
A sketch, c. 2006, by Jack Dorsey, envisioning an SMS-based social network

Jack Dorsey claims to have introduced the idea of an individual using an SMS service to communicate to a small group in 2006. The original project code name for the service was Twttr, an idea that Evan Williams later ascribed to Noah Glass, inspired by Flickr and the five-character length of American SMS short codes. The decision was also partly due to the fact that the domain twitter.com was already in use, and it was six months after the launch of Twttr that the crew purchased the domain and changed the name of the service to Twitter. Work on the project started in February 2006.

We wanted to capture that in the name—we wanted to capture that feeling: the physical sensation that you're buzzing your friend's pocket. It's like buzzing all over the world. So we did a bunch of name-storming, and we came up with the word "twitch", because the phone kind of vibrates when it moves. But "twitch" is not a good product name because it doesn't bring up the right imagery. So we looked in the dictionary for words around it, and we came across the word "twitter", and it was just perfect. The definition was "a short burst of inconsequential information," and "chirps from birds." And that's exactly what the product was.	— Jack Dorsey

The first Twitter prototype, developed by Dorsey and contractor Florian Weber, was used as an internal service for Odeo employees. The full version was introduced publicly on July 15, 2006. In October 2006, Biz Stone, Evan Williams, Dorsey, and other members of Odeo formed Obvious Corporation and acquired Odeo from the investors and shareholders. Williams fired Glass, who was silent about his part in Twitter's startup until 2011. Twitter spun off into its own company in April 2007. The tipping point for Twitter's popularity was the 2007 South by Southwest Interactive (SXSWi) conference. During the event, Twitter usage increased from 20,000 tweets per day to 60,000.

The company experienced rapid initial growth thereafter. In 2009, Twitter won the "Breakout of the Year" Webby Award. In February 2010, Twitter users were sending 50 million tweets per day. By March 2010, the company recorded over 70,000 registered applications. In June 2010, about 65 million tweets were posted each day, equaling about 750 tweets sent each second, according to Twitter. As noted on compete.com, Twitter moved up to the third-highest-ranking social networking site in January 2009 from its previous rank of twenty-second.

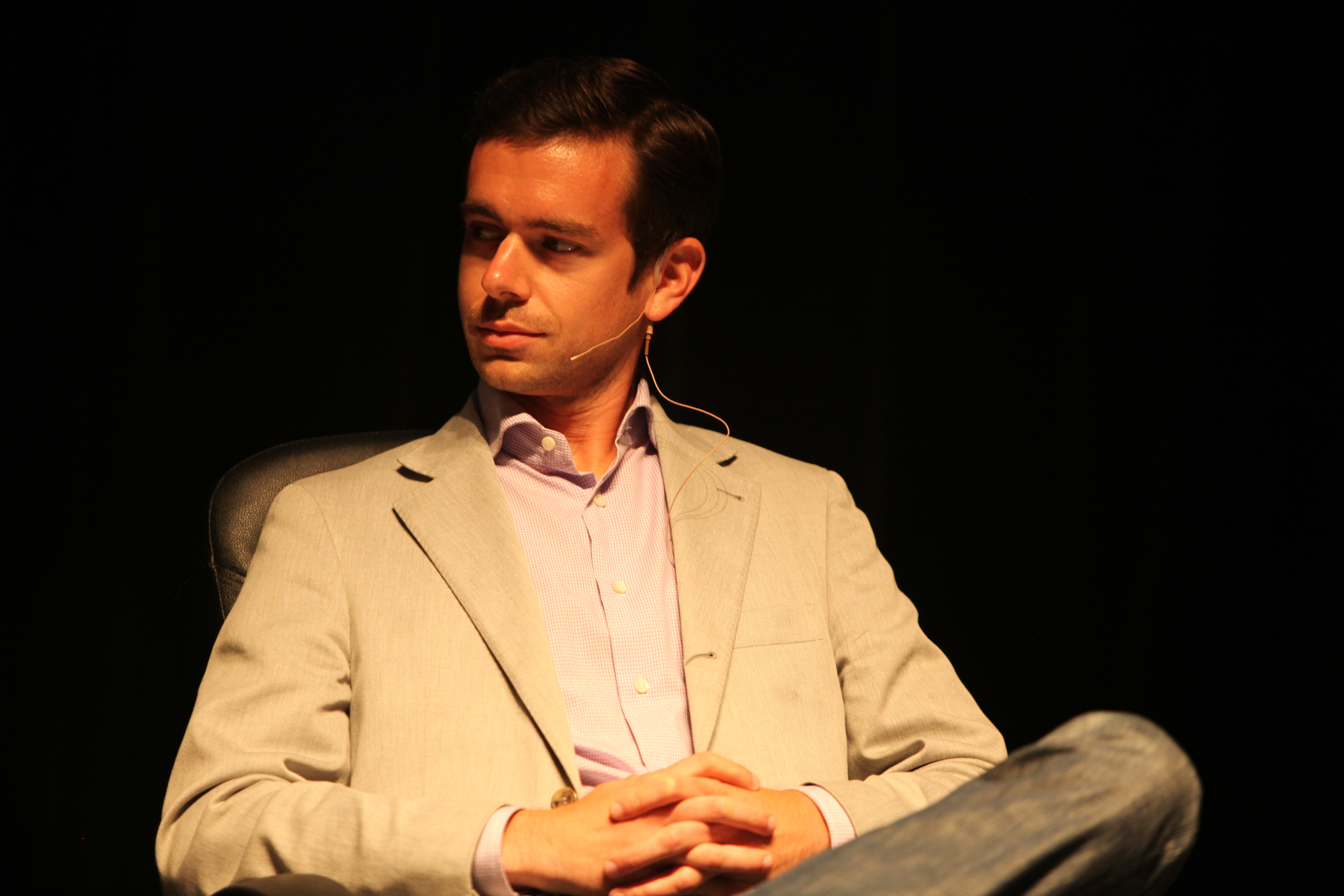
Jack Dorsey, co-founder and former CEO of Twitter at CrunchUp, a TechCrunch event, July 2009

From September through October 2010, the company began rolling out "New Twitter", an entirely revamped edition of twitter.com. Changes included the ability to see pictures and videos without leaving Twitter itself by clicking on individual tweets which contain links to images and clips from a variety of supported websites, including YouTube and Flickr, and a complete overhaul of the interface. In 2019, Twitter was announced to be the 10th most downloaded mobile app of the decade, from 2010 to 2019.

On March 21, 2012, Twitter celebrated its sixth birthday by announcing that it had 140 million users, a 40% rise from September 2011, who were sending 340 million tweets per day. On June 5, 2012, a modified logo was unveiled through the company blog, removing the text to showcase the slightly redesigned bird as the sole symbol of Twitter. On December 18, 2012, Twitter announced it had surpassed 200 million monthly active users. In September 2013, the company's data showed that 200 million users sent over 400 million tweets daily, with nearly 60% of tweets sent from mobile devices.

In April 2014, Twitter underwent a redesign that made the site resemble Facebook somewhat, with a profile picture and biography in a column left to the timeline, and a full-width header image with parallax scrolling effect. (Note: It is not documented whether the parallax scrolling effect was added with the redesign in April 2014 or subsequently.) Late in 2015, it became apparent that growth had slowed, according to Fortune, Business Insider, Marketing Land and other news websites including Quartz (in 2016). In 2019, Twitter released another redesign of its user interface. By the start of 2019, Twitter had more than 330 million monthly active users. Twitter then experienced considerable growth during the COVID-19 pandemic in 2020. The platform also was increasingly used for misinformation related to the pandemic. Twitter started marking tweets which contained misleading information, and adding links to fact-checks.

In 2021, Twitter began the research phase of Bluesky, an open source decentralized social media protocol where users can choose which algorithmic curation they want. The same year, Twitter also released Twitter Spaces, a social audio feature; "super follows", a way to subscribe to creators for exclusive content; and a beta of "ticketed Spaces", which makes access to certain audio rooms paid. Twitter unveiled a redesign in August 2021, with adjusted colors and a new Chirp font, which improves the left-alignment of most Western languages.

=== Since 2022 ===
The original version of the X logo

Elon Musk completed an acquisition of Twitter in October 2022; Musk acted as CEO of Twitter until June 2023 when he was succeeded by Linda Yaccarino. Twitter was rebranded to X on July 23, 2023, and its domain name changed from twitter.com to x.com on May 17, 2024. Yaccarino resigned on July 9, 2025.

Now operating as X, the platform closely resembles its predecessor but includes additional features such as long-form texts, account monetization options, audio-video calls, integration with xAI's Grok chatbot, job search, and a repurposing of the platform's verification system as a subscription premium. Several legacy Twitter features were removed from the site after Musk acquired Twitter, including Circles, NFT profile pictures, and the experimental pronouns in profiles feature. Musk's aims included transforming X into a "digital town square" and an "everything app" akin to WeChat.

Twitter/X has faced significant controversy under Musk's ownership. Issues such as the release of the Twitter Files, suspension of ten journalists' accounts, and labeling media outlets as "state-affiliated" and restricting their visibility have sparked criticism. Despite Musk stepping down as CEO, the platform has continued to face criticism over issues such as viral misinformation, hate speech (especially antisemitism), and child pornography. In response to allegations it deemed unfair, X Corp. has pursued legal action against nonprofit organizations Media Matters and the Center for Countering Digital Hate.

== Appearance and features ==
=== Tweets ===
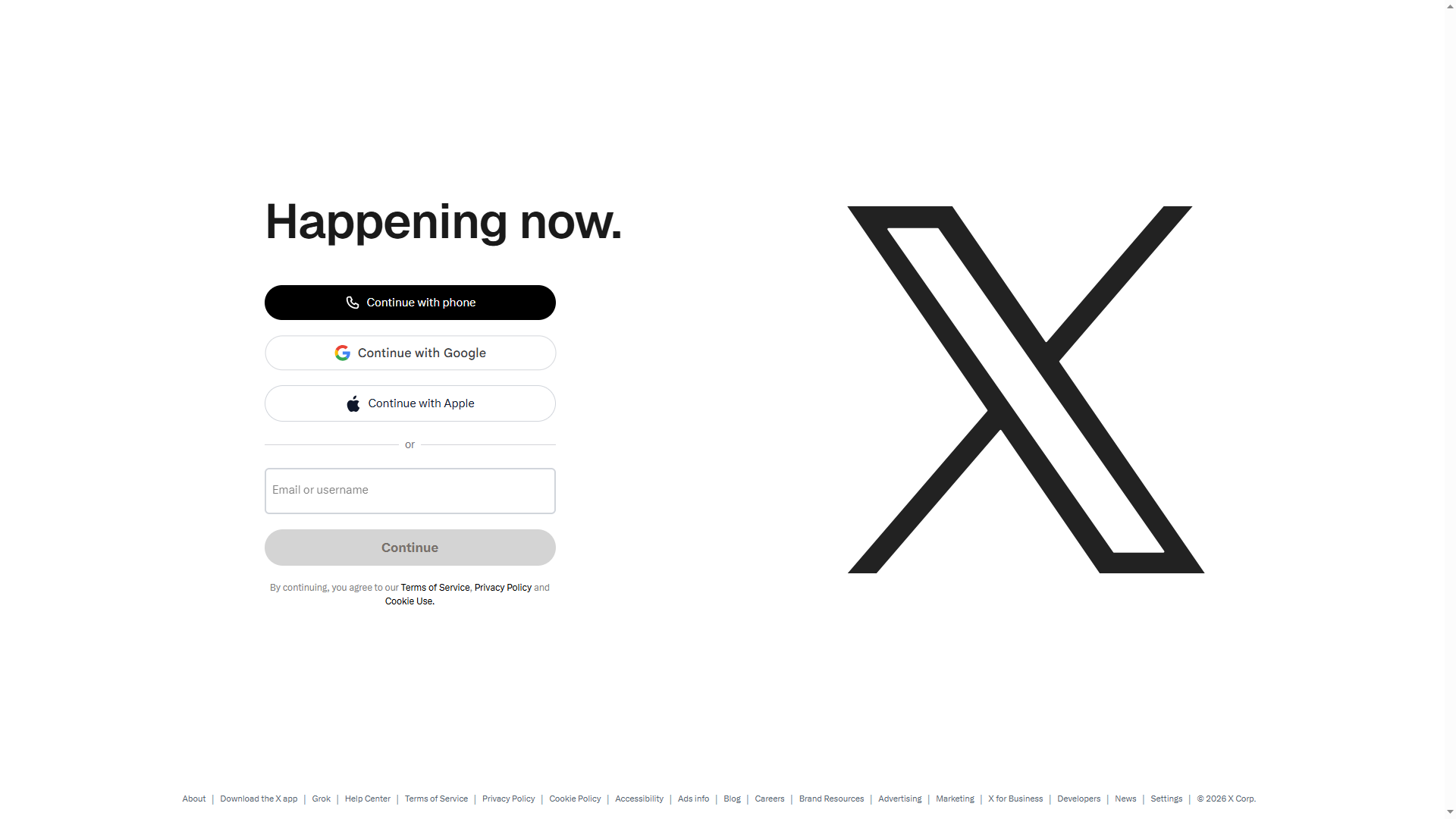
Homepage visited while logged out

Posts (previously, commonly and unofficially called "tweets") are publicly visible by default, but senders can restrict message delivery to their followers. Users can mute users they do not wish to interact with, block accounts from viewing their posts, and remove accounts from their followers list. Users can post via the website, compatible external applications, or by Short Message Service (SMS). Users may subscribe to other users' posts—this is known as "following" and subscribers are known as "followers" or "tweeps", a portmanteau of Twitter and peeps. Posts can be forwarded by other users to their own feed, a process commonly called a "retweet" (officially "repost"). In 2015, Twitter launched "quote tweet", a feature (now named "quote repost") which allows users to add a comment to their post, embedding one post in the other. Users can also "like" individual tweets.

The counters for likes, retweets, and replies appear next to the respective buttons in timelines such as on profile pages and search results. Counters for likes and reposts exist on a post's standalone page too. Since 2020, quote tweets have their own counter. Until the legacy desktop front end that was discontinued in 2020, a row with miniature profile pictures of up to ten liking or retweeting users was displayed, as well as a tweet reply counter next to the according button on a tweet's page.

Twitter allows users to update their profile via their phones either by text messaging or by apps. Twitter announced in a tweet in 2022, that the ability to edit a tweet was being tested for select users. Eventually, all Twitter Blue subscribers would be able to use the feature. Users can group posts together by topic or type by use of hashtags – words or phrases prefixed with a "#" sign. Similarly, the "@" sign followed by a username is used for mentioning or replying to other users. In 2014, Twitter introduced hashflags, special hashtags that automatically generate a custom emoji next to them for a period of time. Hashflags may be generated by Twitter themselves or purchased by corporations. To repost a message from another user and share it with one's own followers, a user can click the repost button within the post. Users can reply to other accounts' replies. Users can hide replies to their messages and select who can reply to each of their tweets before sending them: anyone, accounts who follow the post's author, specific accounts, or none.

The original, strict 140 character limit was gradually relaxed. In 2016, Twitter announced that attachments, links, and media such as photos, videos, and the person's handle, would no longer count. In 2017, Twitter handles were similarly excluded and Twitter doubled its character limitation to 280. Under the new limit, glyphs are counted as a variable number of characters, depending upon the script they are from. From 2023 Twitter Blue users could create posts with up to 4,000 characters in length.

t.co is a URL shortening service created by Twitter. It is only available for links posted to Twitter and not general use. All links posted to Twitter use a t.co wrapper. Twitter intended the service to protect users from malicious sites, and to use it to track clicks on links within tweets.

In June 2011, Twitter announced its own integrated photo-sharing service that enables users to upload a photo and attach it to a Tweet right from Twitter.com. Users now have the ability to add pictures to Twitter's search by adding hashtags to the tweet. Twitter plans to provide photo galleries designed to gather and syndicate all photos that a user has uploaded on Twitter and third-party services such as TwitPic. In 2016 Twitter introduced the ability to add a caption of up to 480 characters to each image attached to a tweet, accessible via screen reading software or by hovering the mouse above a picture inside TweetDeck. In 2022, Twitter made the ability to add and view captions globally available. Descriptions can be added to any uploaded image with a limit of 1000 characters. Images that have a description will feature a badge that says ALT in the bottom left corner, which will bring up the description when clicked.

In 2015, Twitter began to roll out the ability to attach poll questions to tweets. Polls are open for up to 7 days, and voters are not identified. In Twitter's early years, users could communicate with Twitter using SMS. This was discontinued in most countries in April 2020 after hackers exposed vulnerabilities.

=== Multimedia content ===
In 2016, Twitter began to place a larger focus on live streaming video programming, hosting events including streams of the Republican and Democratic conventions, and winning a bid for non-exclusive streaming rights to ten NFL games in 2016. In 2017, Twitter announced that it planned to construct a 24-hour streaming video channel hosted within the service, featuring content from various partners. Twitter announced a number of new and expanded partnerships for its streaming video services at the event, including Bloomberg, BuzzFeed, Cheddar, IMG Fashion, Live Nation Entertainment, Major League Baseball, MTV and BET, NFL Network, the PGA Tour, The Players' Tribune, Ben Silverman and Howard T. Owens' Propagate, The Verge, Stadium and the WNBA. as of the first quarter of 2017, Twitter had over 200 content partners, who streamed over 800 hours of video over 450 events.

Twitter Spaces is a social audio feature that enables users to host or participate in a live-audio virtual environment called space for conversation. A maximum of 13 people are allowed onstage. The feature was initially limited to users with at least 600 followers, but since October 2021, any Twitter user can create a Space.

In March 2020, Twitter began to test a stories feature known as "fleets" in some markets, which officially launched on November 17, 2020. Fleets could contain text and media, are only accessible for 24 hours after they are posted, and are accessed within the Twitter app; Twitter announced it would start implementing advertising into fleets in June 2021. Fleets were removed in August 2021; Twitter had intended for fleets to encourage more users to tweet regularly, but instead they were generally used by already-active users.

=== Trending topics ===
Twitter introduced its "trends" feature in mid-2008, an algorithmic lists of trending topics among users. A word or phrase mentioned can become "trending topic" based on an algorithm. Because a relatively small number of users can affect trending topics through a concerted campaign, the feature has been the target of concerted manipulation campaigns. While some campaigns are innocuous, others have promoted conspiracy theories or hoaxes, or sought to amplify extremist messages. Some featured trends are globally displayed, while others are limited to a specific country.

A 2021 study by EPFL researchers found that frequent "ephemeral astroturfing" efforts targeted at Trends; from 2015 to 2019, "47% of local trends in Turkey and 20% of global trends are fake, created from scratch by bots...The fake trends discovered include phishing apps, gambling promotions, disinformation campaigns, political slogans, hate speech against vulnerable populations and even marriage proposals." The MIT Technology Review reported that, as of 2022, Twitter "sometimes manually overrides particularly objectionable trends" and, for some trends, used both algorithmic and human input to select representative tweets with context.

=== Lists ===
In late 2009, the "Twitter Lists" feature was added, making it possible for users to follow a curated list of accounts all at once, rather than following individual users. Currently, lists can be set to either public or private. Public lists may be recommended to users via the general Lists interface and appear in search results. If a user follows a public list, it will appear in the "View Lists" section of their profile, so that other users may quickly find it and follow it as well. Private lists can only be followed if the creator shares a specific link to their list. Lists add a separate tab to the Twitter interface with the title of the list, such as "News" or "Economics".

=== Moments ===
In October 2015, Twitter introduced "Moments"—a feature that allows users to curate tweets from other users into a larger collection. Twitter initially intended the feature to be used by its in-house editorial team and other partners; they populated a dedicated tab in Twitter's apps, chronicling news headlines, sporting events, and other content. In September 2016, creation of moments became available to all Twitter users.

=== Algorithm ===
On October 21, 2021, a report based on a "long-running, massive-scale randomized experiment" that analyzed "millions of tweets sent between 1 April and 15 August 2020", found that Twitter's machine learning recommendation algorithm amplified right-leaning politics on personalized user Home timelines. The report compared seven countries with active Twitter users where data was available (Germany, Canada, the United Kingdom, Japan, France, and Spain) and examined tweets "from major political groups and politicians". Researchers used the 2019 Chapel Hill Expert Survey (CHESDATA) to position parties on political ideology within each country. The "machine learning algorithms", introduced by Twitter in 2016, personalized 99% of users' feeds by displaying tweets (even older tweets and retweets from accounts the user had not directly followed) that the algorithm had "deemed relevant" to the users' past preferences. Twitter randomly chose 1% of users whose Home timelines displayed content in reverse-chronological order from users they directly followed.

In 2026, a report released in Nature found X's feed algorithm promotes conservative content and deprioritizes traditional media in favor of conservative activists. Based on an analysis of 4,965 participants in 2023 over 7 weeks, it found switching from a chronological feed to an algorithmic feed increased engagement and shifted users to adopt conservative political positions, particularly around "policy priorities, perceptions of criminal investigations into Donald Trump and views on the war in Ukraine". It also found that exposure to algorithmic content led users to follow conservative political accounts and that users kept following them even after the algorithm was switched off.

=== Mobile ===
Twitter had mobile apps for iPhone, iPad, and Android. In April 2017, Twitter introduced Twitter Lite, a progressive web app designed for regions with unreliable and slow Internet connections, with a size of less than one megabyte, designed for devices with limited storage capacity.

=== X Premium (formerly Twitter Blue) ===
On June 3, 2021, Twitter announced a paid subscription service called Twitter Blue. Following Twitter's rebranding to "X", the subscription service was initially renamed to X Blue (or simply Blue), and, on August 5, 2023, was rebranded as X Premium (or simply Premium). The subscription provides additional premium features to the service. In November 2023 a "Premium+" subscription was launched, with a higher monthly fee giving benefits such as the omission of adverts on For You and Following feeds.

==== Verification of paid accounts ====
In November 2022, Musk announced plans to add account verification and the ability to upload longer audio and video to Twitter Blue. A previous perk offering advertising-free news articles from participating publishers was dropped, but Musk stated that Twitter did want to work with publishers on a similar "paywall bypass" perk. Musk had pushed for a more expensive version of Twitter Blue following his takeover, arguing that it would be needed to offset a decline in advertising revenue. Twitter states that paid verification is required to help reduce fraudulent accounts.

The verification marker was included in a premium tier of Twitter Blue introduced on November 9, 2022, priced at US$7.99 per month. On November 11, 2022, after the introduction of this feature led to prominent issues involving accounts using the feature to impersonate public figures and companies, Twitter Blue with verification was temporarily suspended. After about a month, Twitter Blue was relaunched on December 12, 2022, though for those purchasing the service through the iOS app store, the cost will be $10.99 a month as to offset the 30% revenue split that Apple takes.

Twitter initially grandfathered users and entities that had gained verification due to their status as public figures, referring to them as "legacy verified accounts" that "may or may not be notable". On March 25, 2023, it was announced that "legacy" verification status would be removed; a subscription will be required to retain verified status, costing $1,000 per-month for organizations (which are designated with a gold verified symbol), plus an additional $50 for each "affiliate". The change was originally scheduled for April 1, 2023, but was delayed to April 20, 2023, following criticism of the changes. Musk also announced plans for the "For You" timeline to prioritize verified accounts and user followers only beginning April 15, 2023, and threatened to only allow verified users to participate in polls (although the latter change has yet to occur).

Effective April 21, 2023, Twitter requires companies to participate in the verified organizations program to purchase advertising on the platform, although companies that spend at least $1,000 on advertising per-month automatically receive membership in the program at no additional cost. From April 25, 2023, verified users are now prioritized in replies to tweets.

=== User monetization ===
In 2021, the company opened applications for its premium subscription options called Super Follows. This lets eligible accounts charge $2.99, $4.99 or $9.99 per month to subscribe to the account. The launch only generated about $6,000 in its first two weeks. In 2023, the Super Follows feature was rebranded as simply "subscriptions", allowing users to publish exclusive long-form posts and videos for their subscribers; the pivot in marketing was reportedly intended to help compete with Substack.

In May 2021, Twitter began testing a Tip Jar feature on its iOS and Android clients. The feature allows users to send monetary tips to certain accounts, providing a financial incentive for content creators on the platform. The Tip Jar is optional and users can choose whether or not to enable tips for their account. On September 23, 2021, Twitter announced that it will allow users to tip users on the social network with bitcoin. The feature will be available for iOS users. Previously, users could tip with fiat currency using services such as Square's Cash App and PayPal's Venmo. Twitter will integrate the Strike bitcoin lightning wallet service. It was noted that at this current time, Twitter will not take a cut of any money sent through the tips feature.

On August 27, 2021, Twitter rolled out Ticketed Spaces, which let Twitter Spaces hosts charge between $1 and $999 for access to their rooms. In April 2022, Twitter announced that it will partner with Stripe, Inc. for piloting cryptocurrency payouts for limited users in the platform. Eligible users of Ticketed Spaces and Super Follows will be able to receive their earnings in the form of USD coin, a stablecoin whose value is that of the U.S. dollar. Users can also hold their earnings in crypto wallets, and then exchange them into other cryptocurrencies.

=== E-commerce ===
In 2014, Twitter began a gradual roll-out of their "Buy Now" button to US users based on ideas conceived by then head of commerce Nathan Hubbard. The feature was created after he acquired the start-up company CardSpring. It was created with the intention of testing the idea's commercial viability rather than revenue. Its function allowed users to find more information about advertised product and enter shipping and payment information within the platform to complete and mediate transactions. Twitter began to gradually discontinue the button by 2017 after the idea achieved mixed success, although it still offered a "Donate" button for philanthropic purposes. By 2021, Twitter began creating more e-commerce features such as Super Follows and Professional Profile, which allowed users to connect to products easier and businesses to display operational details on their Twitter accounts, respectively. That July, Twitter began testing an e-commerce "Shop Module" feature for US users on English iOS devices, which allowed users to find more information about advertised products in the app. They only gave provided a select group of pilot testers access to the feature. It allowed accounts associated with brands to display a carousel of cards on their profiles showcasing products. Unlike the Buy button, where order fulfillment was handed from within Twitter, these cards are external links to online storefronts from which the products may be purchased. In March 2022, Twitter expanded the test to allow companies to showcase up to 50 products on their profiles. In November 2021, Twitter introduced support for "shoppable" live streams, in which brands can hold streaming events that similarly display banners and pages highlighting products that are featured in the presentation.

=== X Money ===
In January 2025, X announced plans to introduce an "X Money Account" feature in 2025. The product would be a digital wallet and enable X users to move funds between traditional bank accounts and their digital wallet and make instant peer-to-peer payments. Visa was announced as partnering with X on the project and, at least initially, cryptocurrencies would not be supported. X Money launched in July 2026.

=== Grok ===
In 2024 and 2025, xAI fully integrated its Grok assistant into X for Premium subscribers, enabling real-time news summarization, automated image generation, and multi-modal search across user posts.

== Usage ==
Daily user estimates vary as the company does not publish statistics on active accounts. A February 2009 Compete.com blog entry ranked Twitter as the third most used social network based on their count of 6 million unique monthly visitors and 55 million monthly visits. An April 2017 a statista.com blog entry ranked Twitter as the tenth most used social network based on their count of 319 million monthly visitors. Its global user base in 2017 was 328 million. According to Musk, the platform had 500 million monthly active users in March 2023, 550 million in March 2024, and 600 million in May 2024.

=== Demographics ===
In 2009, Twitter was mainly used by older adults who might not have used other social sites before Twitter. According to comScore only 11% of Twitter's users were aged 12 to 17. According to a study by Sysomos in June 2009, women made up a slightly larger Twitter demographic than men—53% over 47%. It also stated that 5% of users accounted for 75% of all activity. According to Quantcast, 27 million people in the US used Twitter in September 2009; 63% of Twitter users were under 35 years old; 60% of Twitter users were Caucasian, but a higher than average (compared to other Internet properties) were African American/black (16%) and Hispanic (11%); 58% of Twitter users have a total household income of at least US$60,000. The prevalence of African American Twitter usage and in many popular hashtags has been the subject of research studies.

Twitter grew from 100 million monthly active users (MAUs) in September 2011, to 255 million in March 2014, and more than 330 million in early 2019. In 2013, there were over 100 million users actively using Twitter daily and about 500 million tweets every day. A 2016 Pew research poll found that Twitter is used by 24% of all online US adults. It was equally popular with men and women (24% and 25% of online Americans respectively), but more popular with younger generations (36% of 18–29-year olds). A 2019 survey conducted by the Pew Foundation found that Twitter users are three times as likely to be younger than 50 years old, with the median age of adult U.S. users being 40. The survey found that 10% of users who are most active on Twitter are responsible for 80% of all tweets.

=== Content ===
Content of tweets according to Pear Analytics in August 2009 News (3.6%) Spam (3.8%) Self-promotion (6%) Pointless babble (40%) Conversational (38%) Pass-along value (8.7%)

San Antonio-based market-research firm Pear Analytics analyzed 2,000 tweets (originating from the United States and in English) over a two-week period in August 2009 from 11:00 am to 5:00 pm (CST) and separated them into six categories. Pointless babble made up 40%, with 38% being conversational. Pass-along value had 9%, self-promotion 6% with spam and news each making 4%.

Despite Jack Dorsey's own open contention that a message on Twitter is "a short burst of inconsequential information", social networking researcher danah boyd responded to the Pear Analytics survey by arguing that what the Pear researchers labeled "pointless babble" is better characterized as "social grooming" or "peripheral awareness" (which she justifies as persons "want[ing] to know what the people around them are thinking and doing and feeling, even when co-presence isn't viable"). Similarly, a survey of Twitter users found that a more specific social role of passing along messages that include a hyperlink is an expectation of reciprocal linking by followers.

=== Levels of use and class action lawsuit ===
According to research published in April 2014, around 44% of user accounts have never tweeted. About 22% of Americans say they have used Twitter, according to a 2019 Pew Research Center survey. In 2009, Nielsen Online reported that Twitter had a user-retention rate of 40%. Many people stop using the service after a month; therefore the site may potentially reach only about 10% of all Internet users. Noting how demographics of Twitter users differ from the average Americans, commentators have cautioned against media narratives that treat Twitter as representative of the population, adding that only 10% of users Tweet actively, and that 90% of Twitter users have Tweeted no more than twice. In 2016, shareholders sued Twitter, alleging it "artificially inflated its stock price by misleading them about user engagement". The company announced on September 20, 2021, that it would pay $809.5 million to settle this class-action lawsuit.

=== Decline on mobile devices ===
As of 2026, usage of X on mobile devices has been in a progressive decline. At the same time, mobile usage of the rival social network Threads has been increasing. In January 2026, Threads usage finally rose to match that of X. X still remains the dominant network on non-mobile traffic.

== Branding ==
Before its rebranding to X, Twitter was internationally identifiable by its signature bird logo, or the Twitter Bird. The original logo, which was simply the word Twitter, was in use from its launch in March 2006. It was accompanied by an image of a bird which was later discovered to be a piece of clip art created by the British graphic designer Simon Oxley. A new logo had to be redesigned by founder Biz Stone with help from designer Philip Pascuzzo, which resulted in a more cartoon-like bird in 2009. This version had been named "Larry the Bird" after Larry Bird of the NBA's Boston Celtics fame.

Within a year, the Larry the Bird logo underwent a redesign by Stone and Pascuzzo to eliminate the cartoon features, leaving a solid silhouette of Larry the Bird that was used from 2010 through 2012. In 2012, Douglas Bowman created a further simplified version of Larry the Bird, keeping the solid silhouette but making it more similar to a mountain bluebird. This logo was simply called the "Twitter Bird" and was used until July 2023.

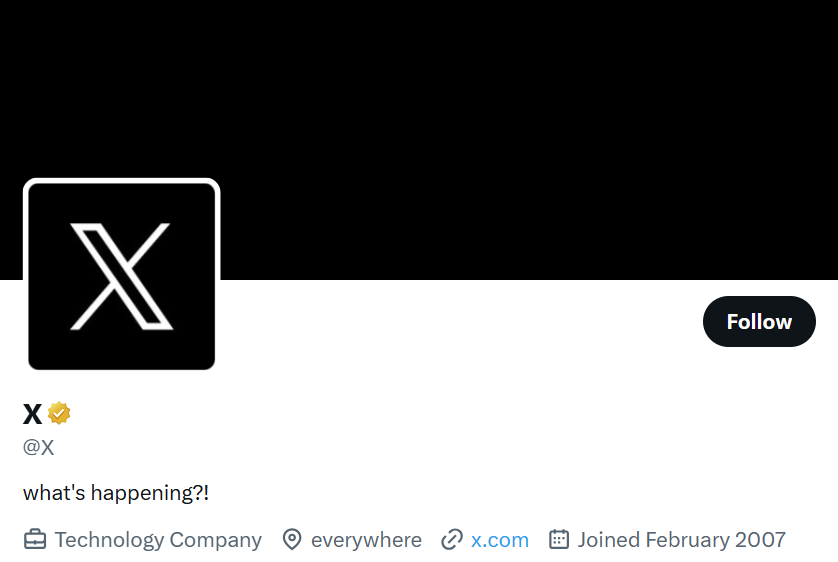
X's profile in August 2025

On July 22, 2023, Elon Musk announced that the service would be rebranded to "X", in his pursuit of creating an "everything app". Musk's profile picture, along with the platform's official accounts, and the icons when browsing/signing up for the platform, were updated to reflect the new logo. The logo resembles the Unicode mathematical alphanumeric symbol U+1D54F 𝕏 MATHEMATICAL DOUBLE-STRUCK CAPITAL X for the letter "X" styled in double-strike bold.

Mike Proulx of The New York Times was critical of this change, saying the brand value has been "wiped out". Mike Carr says the new logo gives a "'Big Brother' tech overlord vibe" in contrast to the "cuddly" nature of the previous bird logo. Users review bombed the newly rebranded "X" app on the iOS App Store on the day it was revealed, and Rolling Stone's Miles Klee said that the rebrand "reeks of desperation".

The startup Operation Bluebird requested to the United States Patent and Trademark Office to cancel the existing Twitter trademarks and open a new one for itself, planning to develop a new page that would restore the name, logos, and page structure of Twitter. They argued that X Corp. may have abandoned the trademark, by not using it commercially. X Corp. started a legal case against them, arguing that the trademark is still valid and enforceable, and that the new site would constitute a trademark infringement. This started the legal dispute X Corp. v. Operation Bluebird.

=== Logo evolution ===
2006–2010

2010–2012

2012–2023

2023–2025

2025–present

== Finances ==
=== Revenue sources ===
On April 13, 2010, Twitter announced plans to offer paid advertising for companies that would be able to purchase "promoted tweets" to appear in selective search results on the Twitter website, similar to Google Ads' (then Adwords) advertising model. Users' photos can generate royalty-free revenue for Twitter, and an agreement with World Entertainment News Network (WENN) was announced in May 2011. Twitter generated an estimated US$139.5 million in advertising sales during 2011.

In June 2011, Twitter announced that it would offer small businesses a self-service advertising system. The self-service advertising platform was launched in March 2012 to American Express card members and merchants in the U.S. on an invite-only basis. To continue their advertising campaign, Twitter announced on March 20, 2012, that promoted tweets would be introduced to mobile devices. In April 2013, Twitter announced that its Twitter Ads self-service platform, consisting of promoted tweets and promoted accounts, was available to all U.S. users without an invite.

On August 3, 2016, Twitter launched Instant Unlock Card, a new feature that encourages people to tweet about a brand to earn rewards and use the social media network's conversational ads. The format itself consists of images or videos with call-to-action buttons and a customizable hashtag.

=== Advertising bans ===
In October 2017, Twitter banned the Russian media outlets RT and Sputnik from advertising on their website following the conclusions of the U.S. national intelligence report the previous January that both Sputnik and RT had been used as vehicles for Russia's interference in the 2016 US presidential election. Maria Zakharova for the Russian foreign ministry said the ban was a "gross violation" by the US of free speech.

In October 2019, Twitter announced it would stop running political ads on its ad platform effective November 22. This resulted from several spurious claims made by political ads. Company CEO Dorsey clarified that Internet advertising had great power and was extremely effective for commercial advertisers, the power brings significant risks to politics where crucial decisions impact millions of lives. The company reversed the ban in August 2023, publishing criteria governing political advertising which do not allow the promotion of false or misleading content, and requiring advertisers to comply with laws, with compliance being the sole responsibility of the advertiser.

In April 2022, Twitter announced a ban on "misleading" advertisements that go against "the scientific consensus on climate change". While the company did not give full guidelines, it stated that the decisions would be made with the help of "authoritative sources", including the Intergovernmental Panel on Climate Change.

=== Coerced advertising ===
A 2025 article in The Wall Street Journal reported that Verizon, Ralph Lauren Corporation, and at least four other companies signed advertising contracts with X following legal threats from Musk and CEO Linda Yaccarino.

=== Fines ===
X has been fined several times for non-compliance with laws and regulations. On May 25, 2022, Twitter was fined $150 million by the Federal Trade Commission and the United States Department of Justice for collecting users' contact details and using them for targeted advertising.

In December 2025, the European Commission fined X €120 million for alleged non-compliance with requirements of the Digital Services Act. Days later, X banned the European Commission from advertising on the platform.

== Technology ==
=== Implementation ===
X relies on open-source software. The X web interface uses the Ruby on Rails framework, deployed on a performance enhanced Ruby Enterprise Edition implementation of Ruby. In the early days of Twitter, tweets were stored in MySQL databases that were temporally sharded (large databases were split based on time of posting). After the huge volume of tweets coming in caused problems reading from and writing to these databases, the company decided that the system needed re-engineering.

From spring 2007 to 2008, the messages were handled by a Ruby persistent queue server called Starling. Since 2009, implementation has been gradually replaced with software written in Scala. The switch from Ruby to Scala and the JVM has given Twitter a performance boost from 200 to 300 requests per second per host to around 10,000–20,000 requests per second per host. This boost was greater than the 10x improvement that Twitter's engineers envisioned when starting the switch. The continued development of Twitter has also involved a switch from monolithic development of a single app to an architecture where different services are built independently and joined through remote procedure calls.

As of April 6, 2011, Twitter engineers confirmed that they had switched away from their Ruby on Rails search stack to a Java server they call Blender. Individual tweets are registered under unique IDs called snowflakes, and geolocation data is added using 'Rockdove'. The URL shortener t.co then checks for a spam link and shortens the URL. Next, the tweets are stored in a MySQL database using Gizzard, and the user receives an acknowledgement that the tweets were sent. Tweets are then sent to search engines via the Firehose API. The process is managed by FlockDB and takes an average of 350 ms. On August 16, 2013, Raffi Krikorian, Twitter's vice president of platform engineering, shared in a blog post that the company's infrastructure handled almost 143,000 tweets per second during that week, setting a new record. Krikorian explained that Twitter achieved this record by blending its homegrown and open source technologies.

=== API and developer platform ===
The service's API allows other web services and applications to integrate with Twitter. Developer interest in Twitter began immediately following its launch, prompting the company to release the first version of its public API in September 2006. The API quickly became iconic as a reference implementation for public REST APIs and is widely cited in programming tutorials.

From 2006 until 2010, Twitter's developer platform experienced strong growth and a highly favorable reputation. Developers built upon the public API to create the first Twitter mobile phone clients as well as the first URL shortener. Between 2010 and 2012, Twitter made a number of decisions that were received unfavorably by the developer community. In 2010, Twitter mandated that all developers adopt OAuth authentication with just 9 weeks of notice. Later that year, Twitter launched its own URL shortener, in direct competition with some of its most well-known third-party developers. And in 2012, Twitter introduced stricter usage limits for its API, "completely crippling" some developers. While these moves successfully increased the stability and security of the service, they were broadly perceived as hostile to developers, causing them to lose trust in the platform.

In July 2020, Twitter released version 2.0 of the public API, and began showcasing Twitter apps made by third-party developers on its Twitter Toolbox section in April 2022. In January 2023, Twitter ended third-party access to its APIs, forcing all third-party Twitter clients to shut down. This was controversial among the developer community, as many third-party apps predated the company's official apps, and the change was not announced beforehand. Twitterrific's Sean Heber confirmed in a blog post that the 16-year-old app has been discontinued. "We are sorry to say that the app's sudden and undignified demise is due to an unannounced and undocumented policy change by an increasingly capricious Twitter – a Twitter that we no longer recognize as trustworthy nor want to work with any longer." In February 2023, Twitter announced it would be ending free access to Twitter API, and began offering paid tier plans with a more limited access.

=== Innovator's patent agreement ===
On April 17, 2012, Twitter announced it would implement an "Innovators Patent Agreement" which would obligate Twitter to only use its patents for defensive purposes.

=== Open source ===
Twitter has a history of both using and releasing open-source software while overcoming technical challenges of their service. A page in their developer documentation thanks dozens of open-source projects which they have used, from revision control software like Git to programming languages such as Ruby and Scala. Software released as open source by the company includes the Gizzard Scala framework for creating distributed datastores, the distributed graph database FlockDB, the Finagle library for building asynchronous RPC servers and clients, the TwUI user interface framework for iOS, and the Bower client-side package manager. The popular Bootstrap frontend framework was also started at Twitter and is 10th most popular repository on GitHub.

On March 31, 2023, Twitter released the source code for Twitter's recommendation algorithm, which determines what tweets show up on the user's personal timeline, to GitHub. According to Twitter's blog post: "We believe that we have a responsibility, as the town square of the internet, to make our platform transparent. So today we are taking the first step in a new era of transparency and opening much of our source code to the global community." Elon Musk, the CEO at the time, had been promising the move for a while – on March 24, 2022, before he owned the site, he polled his followers about whether Twitter's algorithm should be open source, and around 83% of the responses said "yes". In February, he promised it would happen within a week before pushing back the deadline to March 31. Twitter updated its source code repository in January 2026 with a new algorithm that depends on an external large language model (such as ) to evaluate posts, leading researchers to describe the disclosed source code as lacking in transparency. Also in March 2023, Twitter suffered a security attack which resulted in proprietary code being released. Twitter then had the leaked source code removed.

=== Interface ===
Twitter introduced the first major redesign of its user interface in September 2010, adopting a dual-pane layout with a navigation bar along the top of the screen, and an increased focus on the inline embedding of multimedia content. Critics considered the redesign an attempt to emulate features and experiences found in mobile apps and third-party Twitter clients. The new layout was revised in 2011 with a focus on continuity with the web and mobile versions, introducing "Connect" (interactions with other users such as replies) and "Discover" (further information regarding trending topics and news headlines) tabs, an updated profile design, and moving all content to the right pane (leaving the left pane dedicated to functions and the trending topics list). In March 2012, Twitter became available in Arabic, Farsi, Hebrew and Urdu, the first right-to-left language versions of the site. In 2023 the Twitter Web site listed 34 languages supported by Twitter.com.

In September 2012, a new layout for profiles was introduced, with larger "covers" that could be customized with a custom header image, and a display of the user's recent photos posted. The "Discover" tab was discontinued in April 2015, and was succeeded on the mobile app by an "Explore" tab—which features trending topics and moments. In September 2018, Twitter began to migrate selected web users to its progressive web app (based on its Twitter Lite experience for mobile web), reducing the interface to two columns. Migrations to this iteration of Twitter increased in April 2019, with some users receiving it with a modified layout.

In July 2019, Twitter officially released this redesign, with no further option to opt-out while logged in. It is designed to further-unify Twitter's user experience between the web and mobile application versions, adopting a three-column layout with a sidebar containing links to common areas (including "Explore" that has been merged with the search page) which previously appeared in a horizontal top bar, profile elements such as picture and header images and biography texts merged into the same column as the timeline, and features from the mobile version (such as multi-account support, and an opt-out for the "top tweets" mode on the timeline).

=== Security ===
In response to early Twitter security breaches, the United States Federal Trade Commission (FTC) brought charges against the service; the charges were settled on June 24, 2010. This was the first time the FTC had taken action against a social network for security lapses. The settlement requires Twitter to take a number of steps to secure users' private information, including maintenance of a "comprehensive information security program" to be independently audited biannually. After a number of high-profile hacks of official accounts, including those of the Associated Press and The Guardian, in April 2013, Twitter announced a two-factor login verification as an added measure against hacking.

On July 15, 2020, a major hack of Twitter affected 130 high-profile accounts, both verified and unverified ones such as Barack Obama, Bill Gates, and Elon Musk; the hack allowed bitcoin scammers to send tweets via the compromised accounts that asked the followers to send bitcoin to a given public address, with the promise to double their money. Within a few hours, Twitter disabled tweeting and reset passwords from all verified accounts. Analysis of the event revealed that the scammers had used social engineering to obtain credentials from Twitter employees to access an administration tool used by Twitter to view and change these accounts' personal details as to gain access as part of a "smash and grab" attempt to make money quickly, with an estimated US$120,000 in bitcoin deposited in various accounts before Twitter intervened. Several law enforcement entities including the FBI launched investigations into the attack.

On August 5, 2022, Twitter disclosed that a bug introduced in a June 2021 update to the service allowed threat actors to link email addresses and phone numbers to twitter user's accounts. The bug was reported through Twitter's bug bounty program in January 2022 and subsequently fixed. While Twitter originally believed no one had taken advantage of the vulnerability, it was later revealed that a user on the online hacking forum Breach Forums had used the vulnerability to compile a list of over 5.4 million user profiles, which they offered to sell for $30,000. The information compiled by the hacker includes user's screen names, location and email addresses which could be used in phishing attacks or used to deanonymize accounts running under pseudonyms.

=== Outages ===
During an outage, Twitter users were at one time shown the "fail whale" error message image created by Yiying Lu, illustrating eight orange birds using a net to hoist a whale from the ocean captioned "Too many tweets! Please wait a moment and try again." Web designer and Twitter user Jen Simmons was the first to coin the term "fail whale" in a September 2007 tweet. In a November 2013 Wired interview Chris Fry, VP of Engineering at that time, noted that the company had taken the "fail whale" out of use as the platform was now more stable. Twitter had approximately 98% uptime in 2007 (or about six full days of downtime). The downtime was particularly noticeable during events popular with the technology industry such as the 2008 Macworld Conference & Expo keynote address. As of January 16, 2026, Twitter's error message during an outage is "Something went wrong, but don't fret – Let's give it another shot."

== User accounts ==
=== Verified accounts ===
In June 2009, after being criticized by Kanye West and sued by Tony La Russa over unauthorized accounts run by impersonators, the company launched their "Verified Accounts" program. Twitter stated that an account with a "blue tick" verification badge indicates "we've been in contact with the person or entity the account is representing and verified that it is approved". In July 2016, Twitter announced a public application process to grant verified status to an account "if it is determined to be of public interest" and that verification "does not imply an endorsement". Verified status allows access to some features unavailable to other users, such as only seeing mentions from other verified accounts.

In November 2020, Twitter announced a relaunch of its verification system in 2021. According to the new policy, Twitter verifies six different types of accounts; for three of them (companies, brands, and influential individuals like activists), the existence of a Wikipedia page will be one criterion for showing that the account has "Off Twitter Notability". Twitter states that it will re-open public verification applications at some point in "early 2021".

In October 2022, after the takeover of Twitter by Elon Musk, it was reported that verification would instead be included in the paid Twitter Blue service, and that existing verified accounts would lose their status if they do not subscribe. On November 1, Musk confirmed that verification would be included in Blue in the future, dismissing the existing verification system as a "lords & peasants system". After concerns over the possibility of impersonation, Twitter subsequently reimplemented a second "Official" marker, consisting of a grey tick and "Official" text displayed under the username, for high-profile accounts of "government and commercial entities". In December 2022, the "Official" text was replaced by a gold checkmark for organizations, as well as a grey check mark for government and multilateral accounts. In March 2023, the gold check mark was made available for organizations to purchase through the Verified Organizations program (formerly called Twitter Blue for Business).

=== Privacy ===
Tweets are public, but users can also send private "direct messages". Information about who has chosen to follow an account and who a user has chosen to follow is also public, though accounts can be changed to "protected" which limits this information (and all tweets) to approved followers. Twitter collects personally identifiable information about its users and shares it with third parties as specified in its privacy policy. The service also reserves the right to sell this information as an asset if the company changes hands. Advertisers can target users based on their history of tweets and may quote tweets in ads directed specifically to the user.

Twitter launched the beta version of their "Verified Accounts" service on June 11, 2009, allowing people with public profiles to announce their account name. The profile pages of these accounts display a badge indicating their status. On December 14, 2010, the United States Department of Justice issued a subpoena directing Twitter to provide information for accounts registered to or associated with WikiLeaks. Twitter decided to notify its users and said, "... it's our policy to notify users about law enforcement and governmental requests for their information, unless we are prevented by law from doing so."

In May 2011, a claimant known as "CTB" in the case of CTB v Twitter Inc. took action against Twitter at the High Court of Justice of England and Wales, requesting that the company release details of account holders. This followed gossip posted on Twitter about professional footballer Ryan Giggs's private life. This led to the 2011 British privacy injunctions controversy and the "super-injunction". Tony Wang, the head of Twitter in Europe, said that people who do "bad things" on the site would need to defend themselves under the laws of their own jurisdiction in the event of controversy and that the site would hand over information about users to the authorities when it was legally required to do so. He also suggested that Twitter would accede to a UK court order to divulge names of users responsible for "illegal activity" on the site.

Twitter acquired Dasient, a startup that offers malware protection for businesses, in January 2012. Twitter announced plans to use Dasient to help remove hateful advertisers on the website. Twitter also offered a feature which would allow tweets to be removed selectively by country, before deleted tweets used to be removed in all countries. The first use of the policy was to block the account of German neo-Nazi group Besseres Hannover on October 18, 2012. The policy was used again the following day to remove anti-Semitic French tweets with the hashtag #unbonjuif ("a good Jew"). After the sharing of images showing the killing of American journalist James Foley in 2014, Twitter said that in certain cases it would delete pictures of people who had died after requests from family members and "authorized individuals".

In 2015, following updated terms of service and privacy policy, Twitter users outside the United States were legally served by the Ireland-based Twitter International Company instead of Twitter, Inc. The change made these users subject to Irish and European Union data protection laws. On April 8, 2020, Twitter announced that users outside of the European Economic Area or United Kingdom (thus subject to GDPR) will no longer be allowed to opt out of sharing "mobile app advertising measurements" to Twitter third-party partners.

On October 9, 2020, Twitter took additional steps to counter misleading campaigns ahead of the 2020 US Election. Twitter's new temporary update encouraged users to "add their own commentary" before retweeting a tweet, by making 'quoting tweet' a mandatory feature instead of optional. The social network giant aimed at generating context and encouraging the circulation of more thoughtful content. After limited results, the company ended this experiment in December 2020.

On May 25, 2022, Twitter was fined $150 million for collecting users' phone numbers and email addresses used for security and using them for targeted advertising, required to notify its users, and banned from profiting from "deceptively collected data". The Federal Trade Commission (FTC) and the Department of Justice stated that Twitter violated a 2011 agreement not to use personal security data for targeted advertising.

In September 2024, the FTC released a report summarizing 9 company responses (including from X) to orders made by the agency pursuant to Section 6(b) of the Federal Trade Commission Act of 1914 to provide information about user and non-user data collection (including of children and teenagers) and data use by the companies that found that the companies' user and non-user data practices put individuals vulnerable to identity theft, stalking, unlawful discrimination, emotional distress and mental health issues, social stigma, and reputational harm.

=== Harassment ===
In August 2013, Twitter announced plans to introduce a "report abuse" button for all versions of the site following uproar, including a petition with 100,000 signatures, over Tweets that included rape and death threats to historian Mary Beard, feminist campaigner Caroline Criado-Perez and the member of parliament Stella Creasy. Twitter announced new reporting and blocking policies in December 2014, including a blocking mechanism devised by Randi Harper, a target of GamerGate. In February 2015, CEO Dick Costolo said he was 'frankly ashamed' at how poorly Twitter handled trolling and abuse, and admitted Twitter had lost users as a result. As per a research study conducted by IT for Change on abuse and misogynistic trolling on Twitter directed at Indian women in public-political life, women perceived to be ideologically left-leaning, dissenters, Muslim women, political dissenters, and political commentators and women from opposition parties received a disproportionate amount of abusive and hateful messages on Twitter.

In 2016, Twitter announced the creation of the Twitter Trust & Safety Council to help "ensure that people feel safe expressing themselves on Twitter". The council's inaugural members included 50 organizations and individuals. The announcement of Twitter's "Trust & Safety Council" was met with objection from parts of its userbase. Critics accused the member organizations of being heavily skewed towards "the restriction of hate speech" and a Reason article expressed concern that "there's not a single uncompromising anti-censorship figure or group on the list".

Twitter banned 7,000 accounts and limited 150,000 more that had ties to QAnon on July 21, 2020. The bans and limits came after QAnon-related accounts began harassing other users through practices of swarming or brigading, coordinated attacks on these individuals through multiple accounts in the weeks prior. Those accounts limited by Twitter will not appear in searches nor be promoted in other Twitter functions. Twitter said they will continue to ban or limit accounts as necessary, with their support account stating "We will permanently suspend accounts Tweeting about these topics that we know are engaged in violations of our multi-account policy, coordinating abuse around individual victims, or are attempting to evade a previous suspension".

In September 2021, Twitter began beta testing a feature called Safety Mode. The functionality aims to limit unwelcome interactions through automated detection of negative engagements. If a user has Safety Mode enabled, authors of tweets that are identified by Twitter's technology as being harmful or exercising uninvited behavior will be temporarily unable to follow the account, send direct messages, or see tweets from the user with the enabled functionality during the temporary block period. Jarrod Doherty, senior product manager at Twitter, stated that the technology in place within Safety Mode assesses existing relationships to prevent blocking accounts that the user frequently interacts with.

=== Suspect and contested accounts ===
In January 2016, Twitter was sued by the widow of a U.S. man killed in the 2015 Amman shooting attack, claiming that allowing the Islamic State of Iraq and the Levant (ISIL) to continually use the platform, including direct messages in particular, constituted the provision of material support to a terrorist organization, which is illegal under U.S. federal law. Twitter disputed the claim, stating that "violent threats and the promotion of terrorism deserve no place on Twitter and, like other social networks, our rules make that clear". The lawsuit was dismissed by the United States District Court for the Northern District of California, upholding the Section 230 safe harbor, which dictates that the operators of an interactive computer service are not liable for the content published by its users. The lawsuit was revised in August 2016, providing comparisons to other telecommunications devices. The second amended complaint was dismissed by the district court, a decision affirmed on appeal to the U.S. Court of Appeals for the Ninth Circuit on January 31, 2018.

Twitter suspended multiple parody accounts that satirized Russian politics in May 2016, sparking protests and raising questions about where the company stands on freedom of speech. Following public outcry, Twitter restored the accounts the next day without explaining why the accounts had been suspended. The same day, Twitter, along with Facebook, Google, and Microsoft, jointly agreed to a European Union code of conduct obligating them to review "[the] majority of valid notifications for removal of illegal hate speech" posted on their services within 24 hours. In August 2016, Twitter stated that it had banned 235,000 accounts over the past six months, bringing the overall number of suspended accounts to 360,000 accounts in the past year, for violating policies banning use of the platform to promote extremism. On May 10, 2019, Twitter announced that they suspended 166,513 accounts for promoting terrorism in the July–December 2018 period, saying there was a steady decrease in terrorist groups trying to use the platform owing to its "zero-tolerance policy enforcement". According to Vijaya Gadde, Legal, Policy and Trust and Safety Lead at Twitter, there was a reduction of 19% terror related tweets from the previous reporting period (January–June 2018).

As of July 30, 2020, Twitter will block URLs in tweets that point to external websites that contain malicious content (such as malware and phishing content) as well as hate speech, speech encouraging violence, terrorism, child sexual exploitation, breaches of privacy, and other similar content that is already banned as part of the content of tweets on the site. Users that frequently point to such sites may have their accounts suspended. Twitter said this was to bring their policy in line to prevent users from bypassing their tweet content restrictions by simply linking to the banned content.

After the onset of protests by Donald Trump's supporters across the US in January 2021, Twitter suspended more than 70,000 accounts, stating that they shared "harmful QAnon-associated content" at a large scale, and were "dedicated to the propagation of this conspiracy theory across the service". One of the accounts suspended was then-former-president Trump's account; in February 2025, X settled a lawsuit filed by Trump in response to his suspension paying Trump approximately $10 million.

=== Malicious and fake accounts ===
Between January and late July 2017, Twitter had identified and shut down over 7,000 fake accounts created by Iranian influence operations.

In May 2018, in response to scrutiny over the misuse of Twitter by those seeking to maliciously influence elections, Twitter announced that it would partner with the nonprofit organization Ballotpedia to add special labels verifying the authenticity of political candidates running for election in the U.S. In December 2019, Twitter removed 5,929 accounts for violating their manipulation policies. The company investigated and attributed these accounts to a single state-run information operation, which originated in Saudi Arabia. The accounts were reported to be a part of a larger group of 88,000 accounts engaged in spammy behavior. However, Twitter did not disclose all of them as some could possibly be legitimate accounts taken over through hacking.

In March 2021, Twitter suspended around 3,500 fake accounts that were running a campaign to influence the American audience, after the US intelligence officials concluded that the assassination of The Washington Post journalist Jamal Khashoggi was "approved" by the Saudi Crown Prince Mohammed bin Salman. These Saudi accounts were working in two languages, English and Arabic, to influence public opinion around the issue. Many accounts commented directly on the tweets of US-based media houses, including The Post, CNN, CBS News and The Los Angeles Times. Twitter was unable to identify the source of the influence campaign.

As of 2022, the top four countries spreading state-linked Twitter misinformation are Russia, China, Iran and Saudi Arabia.

In November 2025, X began displaying various information on user accounts for transparency such as location, history, and username changes to combat bots and other malicious accounts. Other X users and media commenters noted seeming inconsistencies between some prominent users' claimed location or nationality and the newly displayed data, with experts claiming that these accounts were likely used for "rage farming" or as foreign influence operations.

=== Bot accounts ===
A bot is a computer program that can automatically tweet, retweet, and follow other accounts. Twitter's open application programming interface and the availability of cloud servers make it possible for bots to exist within the social networking site. Benign bots may generate creative content and relevant product updates, whereas malicious bots can make unpopular people seem popular, push irrelevant products on users, and spread misinformation, spam or slander. Bots amass significant influence and have been noted to sway elections, influence the stock market, appeal to the public, and attack governments. As of 2013, Twitter said there were 20 million fake accounts on Twitter, representing less than 5% of active users. A 2020 estimate put the figure at 15% of all accounts or around 48 million accounts.

== Society ==
=== Usage ===
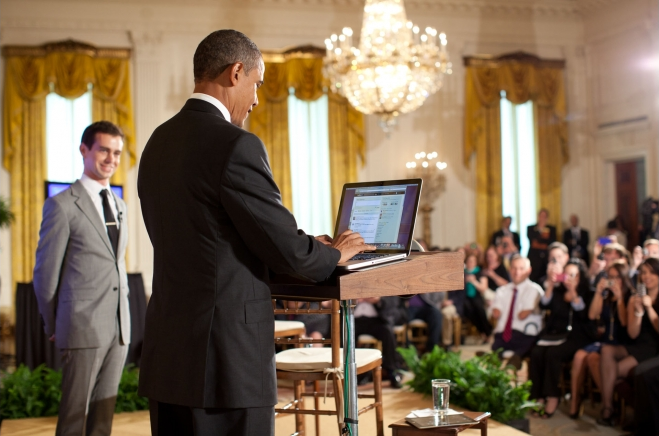
Dorsey (left) said after a Twitter Town Hall with Barack Obama held in July 2011, that Twitter received over 110,000 #AskObama tweets.

==== Protesters ====
Twitter had been used for a variety of purposes in many industries and scenarios. For example, it has been used to organize protests, including the protests over the 2009 Moldovan election, the 2009 student protests in Austria, the 2009 Gaza–Israel conflict, the 2009 Iranian green revolution, the 2010 Toronto G20 protests, the 2010 Bolivarian Revolution, the 2010 Stuttgart 21 protests in Germany, the 2011 Egyptian Revolution, 2011 England riots, the 2011 United States Occupy movement, the 2011 anti-austerity movement in Spain, the 2011 Aganaktismenoi movements in Greece, the 2011 demonstration in Rome, the 2011 Wisconsin labor protests, the 2012 Gaza–Israel conflict, the 2013 protests in Brazil, and the 2013 Gezi Park protests in Turkey.

The service was also used as a form of civil disobedience: In 2010, users expressed outrage over the Twitter joke trial by copying a controversial joke about bombing an airport and attaching the hashtag #IAmSpartacus, a reference to the film Spartacus (1960) and a sign of solidarity and support to a man controversially prosecuted after posting a tweet joking about bombing an airport if they canceled his flight. #IAmSpartacus became the number one trending topic on Twitter worldwide. Another case of civil disobedience happened in the 2011 British privacy injunction debate, where several celebrities who had taken out anonymized injunctions were identified by thousands of users in protest to traditional journalism being censored.

==== Governments ====
According to documents leaked by Edward Snowden and published in July 2014, the United Kingdom's GCHQ has a tool named BIRDSONG for "automated posting of Twitter updates" and a tool named BIRDSTRIKE for "Twitter monitoring and profile collection".

During the 2019–20 Hong Kong protests, Twitter suspended a core group of 1,000 "fake" accounts and an associated network of 200,000 accounts for operating a disinformation campaign that was linked to the Chinese government.

On June 12, 2020, Twitter suspended over 7,000 accounts from Turkey because those accounts were fake profiles, designed to support the Turkish president, Recep Tayyip Erdoğan, and were managed by a central authority. Turkey's communication director said that the decision was illogical, biased, and politically motivated. Turkey blocked access to Twitter twice, once after voice recordings appeared on Twitter in which Erdoğan ordered his son to stash away millions of dollars and another time for 12 hours in the aftermath of the earthquake of February 2023, when Erdoğan blamed the people for a disinformation campaign as they criticized the Government for their lack of help. In May 2021, Twitter labeled one of the tweets by Sambit Patra, a spokesman of the local ruling party BJP in India, as "manipulated media", leading to Twitter's offices in Delhi and Gurgaon being raided by the local police. Later, the Indian government released a statement in July 2021 claiming Twitter has lost its liability protection concerning user-generated content. This was brought on by Twitter's failure to comply with the new IT rules introduced in 2021, with a filing stating that the company failed to appoint executives to govern user content on the platform. In 2025, X sued the Indian government for using the IT Act to block tweets and other content on its platform.

According to a report by Reuters, the United States ran a propaganda campaign to spread disinformation about the Sinovac Chinese COVID-19 vaccine, including using fake social media accounts on Twitter to spread the disinformation that the Sinovac vaccine contained pork-derived ingredients and was therefore haram under Islamic law. The campaign primarily targeted people in the Philippines and used a social media hashtag for "China is the virus" in Tagalog.

==== Pornographic content ====
Twitter allows pornographic content as long as it is marked "sensitive" by uploaders, which puts it behind an interstice and hides it from minors. The "super-follow" feature is said to enable competition with the subscription site OnlyFans, used mainly by sex workers. Many performers use Twitter's service to market and grow their porn businesses, attracting users to paywalled services like OnlyFans by distributing photos and short video clips as advertisements.

In April 2022, Twitter convened a "Red Team" for the project of ACM, "Adult Content Monetization", as it is known internally. Eventually, the project was abandoned, because of the difficulty of implementing Real ID.

==== Child sexual exploitation (pre-acquisition by Elon Musk) ====
A February 2021 report from the company's Health team begins, "While the amount of CSE (child sexual exploitation) online has grown exponentially, Twitter's investment in technologies to detect and manage the growth has not."

Until February 2022, the only way for users to flag illegal content was to flag it as "sensitive media", a broad category that left much of the worst material unprioritized for moderation. In a February report, employees wrote that Twitter, along with other Tech Companies have "accelerated the pace of CSE content creation and distribution to a breaking point where manual detection, review, and investigations no longer scale" by allowing pornography and failing to invest in systems that could effectively monitor it. The working group made several recommendations, but they were not taken up and the group was disbanded. As part of its efforts to monetize porn, Twitter held an internal investigation which reported in April 2022, "Twitter cannot accurately detect child sexual exploitation and non-consensual nudity at scale."

John Doe et al. v. Twitter, a civil lawsuit filed in the 9th Circuit Court, alleges that Twitter benefited from sex trafficking and refused to remove the illegal tweets when first informed of them. In an amicus brief filed in the case, the NCMEC said, "The children informed the company that they were minors, that they had been 'baited, harassed, and threatened' into making the videos, that they were victims of 'sex abuse' under investigation by law enforcement" but Twitter failed to remove the videos, "allowing them to be viewed by hundreds of thousands of the platform's users".

Some major brands, including Dyson, Mazda, Forbes, and PBS Kids suspended their marketing campaigns and pulled their ads from the platform after an investigation showed that Twitter failed to suspend 70% of the accounts that shared or solicited the prohibited content.

==== Deepfake pornography ====
In December 2025, social media users reported that X's integrated chatbot, Grok, would allow users to non-consensually strip individuals, including minors, or show them performing sexually explicit and pornographic acts. The majority of these prompts were targeted at women and girls. Images generated by Grok since December 2025 have been disproportionately of people in bikinis, transparent clothes, and the like, with users being able to generate such images through prompts such as "put her in a bikini". This scandal would lead to significant criticism from lawmakers across the world, calls for bans on X, as well as legal crackdowns on X and xAI for, amongst other reasons, the facilitation of sexual abuse, revenge porn, and child pornography.

=== Impact ===
==== Emergency use ====
A practical use for Twitter's real-time functionality is as an effective de facto emergency communication system for breaking news. It was neither intended nor designed for high-performance communication, but the idea that it could be used for emergency communication was not lost on the creators, who knew that the service could have wide-reaching effects early on when the company used it to communicate during earthquakes. Another practical use that is being studied is Twitter's ability to track epidemics and how they spread. Additionally Twitter serves as a real-time sensor for natural disasters such as bushfires and earthquakes.

==== Education ====
Twitter has been adopted as a communication and learning tool in educational and research settings mostly in colleges and universities. It has been used as a backchannel to promote student interactions, especially in large-lecture courses. Research has found that using Twitter in college courses helps students communicate with each other and faculty, promotes informal learning, allows shy students a forum for increased participation, increases student engagement, and improves overall course grades.

Twitter has been an increasingly growing in the field of education as an effective tool that can be used to encourage learning and idea, or knowledge sharing, in and outside the classroom. By using or creating hashtags, students and educators are able to communicate under specific categories of their choice to enhance and promote education. A broad example of a hashtag used in education is "edchat", to communicate with other teachers and people using that hashtag. Once teachers find someone they want to talk to, they can either direct message the person or narrow down the hashtag to make the topic of the conversation more specific, using hashtags for scichat (science), engchat (English), sschat (social studies).

==== Public figures ====
Jonathan Zittrain, professor of Internet law at Harvard Law School, said that "the qualities that make Twitter seem inane and half-baked are what makes it so powerful." In that same vein, and with Sigmund Freud in mind, political communications expert Matthew Auer observed that well-crafted tweets by public figures often deliberately mix trivial and serious information so as to appeal to all three parts of the reader's personality: the id, ego, and superego. The poets Mira Gonzalez and Tao Lin published a book titled Selected Tweets featuring selections of their tweets over some eight years. The novelist Rick Moody wrote a short story for Electric Literature called "Some Contemporary Characters", composed entirely of tweets.

Many commentators have suggested that Twitter radically changed the format of reporting due to instant, short, and frequent communication. According to The Atlantic writers Benjamin M. Reilly and Robinson Meyer, Twitter has an outsized impact on the public discourse and media. "Something happens on Twitter; celebrities, politicians and journalists talk about it, and it's circulated to a wider audience by Twitter's algorithms; journalists write about the dustup." This can lead to an argument on a Twitter feed looking like a "debate roiling the country... regular people are left with a confused, agitated view of our current political discourse". In a 2018 article in the Columbia Journalism Review, Matthew Ingram argued much the same about Twitter's "oversized role" and that it promotes immediacy over newsworthiness. In some cases, inauthentic and provocative tweets were taken up as common opinion in mainstream articles. Writers in several outlets unintentionally cited the opinions of Russian Internet Research Agency-affiliated accounts.

==== World leaders ====
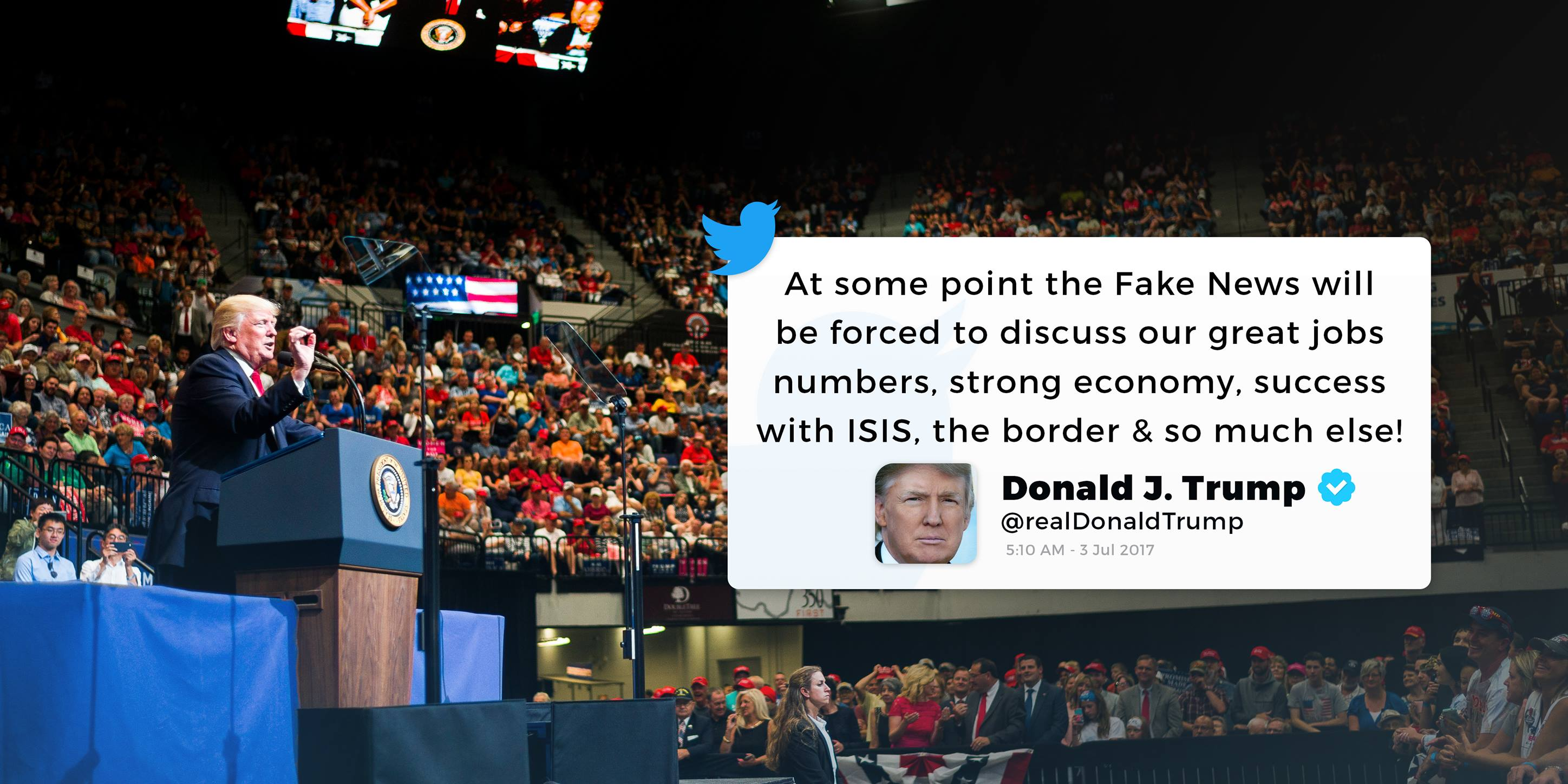
Donald Trump's Twitter post from July 2017

World leaders and their diplomats have taken note of Twitter's rapid expansion and have been increasingly using Twitter diplomacy, the use of Twitter to engage with foreign publics and their own citizens. US Ambassador to Russia, Michael A. McFaul has been attributed as a pioneer of international Twitter diplomacy. He used Twitter after becoming ambassador in 2011, posting in English and Russian. On October 24, 2014, Queen Elizabeth II sent her first tweet to mark the opening of the London Science Museum's Information Age exhibition. A 2013 study by website Twiplomacy found that 153 of the 193 countries represented at the United Nations had established government Twitter accounts. The same study also found that those accounts amounted to 505 Twitter handles used by world leaders and their foreign ministers, with their tweets able to reach a combined audience of over 106 million followers.

According to an analysis of accounts, the heads of state of 125 countries and 139 other leading politicians have Twitter accounts that have between them sent more than 350,000 tweets and have almost 52 million followers; however, only 30 of these do their own tweeting, more than 80 do not subscribe to other politicians and many do not follow any accounts. The Twitter account for the pope was set up in 2012. As of February 2025, it has 18 million followers (@Pontifex).

=== Censorship and moderation ===
X is banned completely in Russia, Iran, China and North Korea, and has been intermittently blocked in numerous countries, including Egypt, Iraq, Nigeria, Turkey, Venezuela and Turkmenistan, on different basis. In 2016, Twitter cooperated with the Israeli government to remove certain content originating outside Israel from tweets seen in Israel. In the 11th biannual transparency report published on September 19, 2017, Twitter said that Turkey was the first among countries where about 90% of removal requests came from, followed by Russia, France and Germany. Twitter stated that between July 1 and December 31, 2018, "We received legal demands relating to 27,283 accounts from 47 different countries, including Bulgaria, Kyrgyzstan, Macedonia, and Slovenia for the first time." As part of evidence to a U.S. Senate Enquiry, the company admitted that their systems "detected and hid" several hundred thousand tweets relating to the 2016 Democratic National Committee email leak. During the curfew in Jammu and Kashmir after revocation of its autonomous status on August 5, 2019, the Indian government approached Twitter to block accounts accused of spreading anti-India content; by October 25, nearly one million tweets had been removed as a result.

In March 2022, shortly after Russia's censorship of Twitter, a Tor onion service link was created by the platform to allow people to access the website, even in countries with heavy Internet censorship. In 2025, India ordered X to block 8,000 accounts to users within India, under threat of fines. X criticized the government's orders and encouraged affected users to seek legal recourse. X uses Age Verify with ID or Photo Selfie for users to access sensitive content like pornography in the UK, EU and EEA to comply with Online Safety Act 2023 and EU's Digital Service.

==== Moderation of tweets ====
Twitter removed more than 88,000 propaganda accounts linked to Saudi Arabia. Twitter removed tweets from accounts associated with the Russian Internet Research Agency that had tried to influence public opinion during and after the 2016 US election. In June 2020, Twitter also removed 175,000 propaganda accounts that were spreading biased political narratives for the Chinese Communist Party, the United Russia Party, or Turkey's President Erdogan, identified based on centralized behavior. Twitter also removed accounts linked to the governments of Armenia, Egypt, Cuba, Serbia, Honduras, Indonesia and Iran. Twitter suspended Pakistani accounts tied to government officials for posting tweets about the Kashmir conflict between India and Pakistan. In February 2021, Twitter removed accounts in India that criticized Prime Minister Narendra Modi's government for its conduct during Indian farmers' protests in 2020–2021.

At the start of the 2020 COVID-19 pandemic, numerous tweets reported false medical information related to the pandemic. Twitter announced a new policy in which they would label tweets containing misinformation going forward. In April 2020, Twitter removed accounts which defended President Rodrigo Duterte's response to the spread of COVID-19 in the Philippines. In November 2020, then Chief Technology Officer and future CEO of Twitter Parag Agrawal, when asked by MIT Technology Review about balancing the protection of free speech as a core value and the endeavour to combat misinformation, said: "Our role is not to be bound by the First Amendment, but our role is to serve a healthy public conversation ... focus less on thinking about free speech, but thinking about how the times have changed."

Musk had been critical of Twitter's moderation of misinformation prior to his acquisition of the company. After the transition, Musk eliminated the misinformation moderation team, and stopped enforcing its policy on labeling tweets with misleading information about coronavirus. While Twitter had joined a voluntary program under the European Union's to fight disinformation in June 2022, Musk pulled the company out of the program in May 2023.

=== Community Notes ===
The logo of Community Notes, November 2022

In August 2020, development of Birdwatch was announced, initially described as a moderation tool. Twitter first launched the Birdwatch program in January 2021, intended as a way to debunk misinformation and propaganda, with a pilot program of 1,000 contributors, weeks after the January 6 United States Capitol attack. The aim was to "build Birdwatch in the open, and have it shaped by the Twitter community". In November 2021, Twitter updated the Birdwatch moderation tool to limit the visibility of contributors' identities by creating aliases for their accounts, in an attempt to limit bias towards the author of notes.

Twitter then expanded access to notes made by the Birdwatch contributors in March 2022, giving a randomized set of US users the ability to view notes attached to tweets and rate them, with a pilot of 10,000 contributors. On average, contributors were noting 43 times a day in 2022 prior to the Russian invasion of Ukraine. This then increased to 156 on the day of the invasion, estimated to be a very small portion of the misleading posts on the platform. By March 1, only 359 of 10,000 contributors had proposed notes in 2022, while a Twitter spokeswoman described plans to scale up the program, with the focus on "ensuring that Birdwatch is something people find helpful and can help inform understanding".

By September 2022, the program had expanded to 15,000 users. In October 2022, the most commonly published notes were related to COVID-19 misinformation based on historical usage. In November 2022, at the request of new owner Elon Musk, Birdwatch was rebranded to Community Notes, taking an open-source approach to deal with misinformation, and expanded to Europe and countries outside of the US.

=== Court cases, lawsuits, and adjudication ===
Twitter Inc. v. Taamneh, alongside Gonzalez v. Google, were heard by the United States Supreme Court during its 2022–2023 term. Both cases dealt with Internet content providers and whether they are liable for terrorism-related information posted by their users. In the case of Twitter v. Taamneh, the case asked if Twitter and other social media services are liable for user-generated terrorism content under the Antiterrorism and Effective Death Penalty Act of 1996 and are beyond their Section 230 protections. The court ruled in May 2023 that the charges brought against Twitter and other companies were not permissible under the Antiterrorism Act, and did not address the Section 230 question. This decision also supported the Court's per curiam decision in Gonzalez returning that case to the lower court for review in light of the Twitter decision.

In 2016, Twitter shareholder Doris Shenwick filed a lawsuit against Twitter, Inc., claiming executives misled investors over the company's growth prospects. In 2021, Twitter agreed to pay $809.5 million to settle.

In May 2022, Twitter agreed to pay $150 million to settle a lawsuit started by the Department of Justice and the Federal Trade Commission. The lawsuit concerned Twitter's use of email addresses and phone numbers of Twitter users to target advertisements at them. The company also agreed to third-party audits of its data privacy program. On November 3, 2022, on the eve of expected layoffs, a group of Twitter employees based in San Francisco and Cambridge filed a lawsuit in the U.S. District Court in San Francisco. Naming five current or former workers as plaintiffs, the suit accused the company of violating federal and state laws that govern notice of employment termination. The federal law in question is the Worker Adjustment and Retraining Notification (WARN) Act, and the state law in question is California's state WARN Act.

On November 20, 2023, X filed a lawsuit against Media Matters, a media watchdog group. The lawsuit alleges defamation by Media Matters following its publication of a report claiming that advertisements for major brands were displayed alongside posts promoting Adolf Hitler and the Nazi Party.

On August 6, 2024, X filed an antitrust lawsuit in the Northern District of Texas against the World Federation of Advertisers, Unilever, Mars, CVS and Ørsted, alleging that the advertisers had conspired via their participation in the Global Alliance for Responsible Media to withhold "billions of dollars in advertising revenue" from the platform. The World Federation Of Advertisers created the Global Alliance for Responsible Media in 2019 to address "illegal or harmful content on digital media platforms and its monetization via advertising". On August 13, 2024, the Workplace Relations Commission ordered X to pay €550,000 to former senior staffer Gary Rooney in an unfair dismissal case. X had argued that Rooney's failure to check "yes" at the bottom of an email from Elon Musk constituted resignation.

In August 2024, the Federal Supreme Court of Brazil blocked X throughout the country due to their alleged non-compliance to Brazilian judicial rulings. The platform resumed its operations in the country in October 2024, after complying with judicial requests.

== Criticism ==
Twitter has faced significant controversy since its acquisition by Musk and rebranding to X, including an increase in misinformation, hate speech and antisemitism. According to a report published by the "Never Again" Association, X refuses to remove hate speech or ignores reports.

Researchers have called for greater transparency especially ahead of national elections, based on findings that the platform algorithm favors a small number of popular accounts, in particular right-leaning users.

In July 2025, Musk and xAI's artificial intelligence tool, Grok, faced backlash from X users and the Anti-Defamation League regarding a series of antisemitic tweets made in response to the July 2025 Central Texas floods. The Grok account acknowledged the "inappropriate" posts and removed the comments. The incident is reported to have happened just days after Musk announced updates to Grok, noting that users should see "a difference when you ask Grok questions."

In November 2026, major political and business accounts had old posts with bit.ly links hijacked to show unrelated, sometimes controversial content. Political figures such as Donald Trump and Justin Trudeau, and businesses such as McDonald's and Nintendo were affected. Examples include a post made by Trump linking to the Wikipedia page of the Epstein files, and another post by fast food chain Burger King linking to the List of Nazi concentration camps. Other more innocuous examples include linking to gameplay of the game Geometry Dash, a Mario Party 9 advertisement from Nintendo linking to a Mario video made by Vsauce, and a link to a fanmade suggestive video of Bowser from the Super Mario series passing gas that has become a meme.

One user, @tiagozip_, claimed responsibility for a hijacked tweet by Donald Trump that linked to resources for homemade hormone replacement therapy methods for transgender individuals. This particular link led to a separate controversy, with critics saying that linking to DIY hormone replacement methods on a site whose primary audience is far right and anti-trans could lead to the resource being taken down, or lead to legal consequences.

Accounts affected by the link hijacking were not hacked, rather expired bitly links from old tweets had their redirects changed. This is known as "dead link hijacking". A similar incident occurred in 2025, when cryptocurrency scammers used old Donald Trump tweets with hijacked bitly links to promote their shitcoins. This issue has since been fixed, as bitly links no longer embed automatically.

== Statistics ==
=== User accounts with large follower base ===
As of May 2025, the ten X accounts with the most followers were:

Top ten most-followed X accounts
Rank	Change (Note: Raw number of followers compared to November 29, 2023)	Account name	Owner	Followers (millions)	Activity	Country
1	Steady	@elonmusk	Elon Musk	220.1	Business magnate and chairman	South Africa; Canada; United States
2	Steady	@BarackObama	Barack Obama	130.3	44th U.S. president	United States
3	Steady	@Cristiano	Cristiano Ronaldo	115.4	Footballer	Portugal
4	▲	@narendramodi	Narendra Modi	108.736	Prime Minister of India	India
5	▼	@justinbieber	Justin Bieber	108.702	Musician	Canada
6	▼	@rihanna	Rihanna	107.7	Musician and businesswoman	Barbados
7	▲	@realDonaldTrump	Donald Trump	105.1	45th and 47th U.S. president	United States
8	▼	@katyperry	Katy Perry	104.6	Musician	United States
9	Steady	@taylorswift13	Taylor Swift	94.1	Musician	United States
10	Steady	@NASA	NASA	86.7	Space agency	United States

=== Record tweets ===
The "Oscar Selfie" orchestrated by 86th Academy Awards host Ellen DeGeneres during the March 2, 2014, broadcast was, at the time, the most retweeted image ever. The photo of twelve celebrities broke the previous retweet record within forty minutes and was retweeted over 1.8 million times in the first hour. On May 9, 2017, Ellen's record was broken by Carter Wilkerson (@carterjwm) by collecting nearly 3.5 million retweets in a little over a month. This record was broken when Yusaku Maezawa announced a giveaway on Twitter in January 2019, accumulating 4.4 million retweets. A similar tweet he made in December 2019 was retweeted 3.8 million times.

The most tweeted moment in the history of Twitter occurred on August 2, 2013; during a Japanese television airing of the Studio Ghibli film Castle in the Sky, fans simultaneously tweeted the word balse (バルス)—the incantation for a destruction spell used during its climax, after it was uttered in the film. There was a global peak of 143,199 tweets in one second, beating the previous record of 33,388. The most discussed event in Twitter history occurred on October 24, 2015; the hashtag ("#ALDubEBTamangPanahon") for Tamang Panahon, a live special episode of the Filipino variety show Eat Bulaga! at the Philippine Arena, centering on its popular on-air couple AlDub, attracted 41 million tweets. The most-discussed sporting event in Twitter history was the 2014 FIFA World Cup semi-final between Brazil and Germany on July 8, 2014.

According to Guinness World Records, the fastest pace to a million followers was set by actor Robert Downey Jr. in 23 hours and 22 minutes in April 2014. This record was later broken by Caitlyn Jenner, who joined the site on June 1, 2015, and amassed a million followers in just 4 hours and 3 minutes.

== See also ==
- Ambient awareness – Term used to describe a form of peripheral social awareness
- Comparison of microblogging and similar services
- Timeline of social media
