= Spoon theory =

Metaphor for managing limited energy

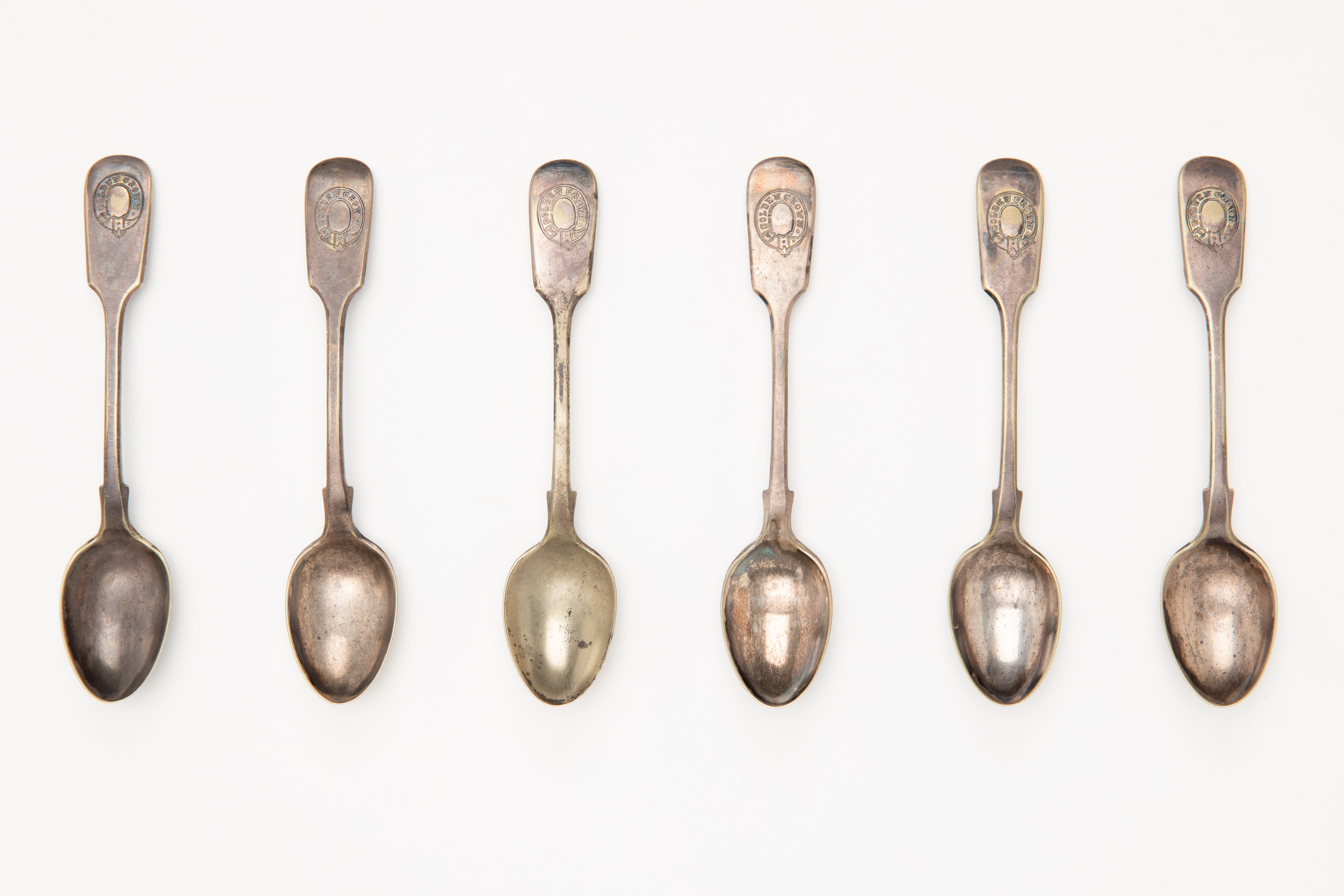
Spoons are used as a metaphor for energy rationing.

Spoon theory is a concept used to represent how individuals manage limited energy. It is a metaphor describing the amount of physical or mental energy that a person has available for daily activities and tasks, and how it can become limited. The term was coined in a 2003 essay by American writer Christine Miserandino. In the essay, Miserandino describes her experience with chronic illness, using a handful of spoons as a metaphor for units of energy available to perform everyday actions. The metaphor has since been used to describe a wide range of disabilities, mental health issues, forms of marginalization, and other factors that might place unseen burdens on individuals. In conjunction with spoon theory, members of the chronic illness community have developed several related theories to describe other aspects of energy management.

== Origin ==
In her 2003 essay "The Spoon Theory", American writer Christine Miserandino writes about a time she told a friend about her experience with lupus. As they were at a restaurant, Miserandino took a number of spoons from the tables and handed them to her friend. Miserandino said that while most people begin each day with an "unlimited amount of possibilities", people with chronic illness have to plan their actions in order to conserve their energy. The number of spoons represented how much energy was available to spend throughout the day. Miserandino asked her friend to list the different tasks and errands that she might perform on a typical day, with Miserandino interrupting and taking away a spoon for each activity – such as washing her hair, or standing on a train – that required some effort or would otherwise be affected by lupus.

== Chronic illness ==
Those with chronic illness or pain have reported feelings of difference and alienation from people without disabilities. The spoon metaphor and the claiming of the term spoonie has been utilized to build support communities for those with chronic illness.

Spoons are a metaphor used as a unit of measurement to visualize the mental and physical energy a person has available for activities of everyday life and productive tasks throughout a given amount of time (e.g. a day or week).

Because of this, many people with chronic illness have to plan in advance and ration their energy and activities throughout the day. Activities of daily living must often be curtailed or avoided, because they carry an invisible cost in terms of spoons available later for other things. This has been described as being a major concern of people with a (fatigue-related) disability or chronic condition/illness/disease because people without these disabilities are not typically concerned with the energy expended during ordinary tasks such as bathing and getting dressed. The theory explains the difference and facilitates discussion between those with limited energy reserves and those with (seemingly) limitless energy reserves.

== Other uses ==
Spoon theory has since spread throughout the disability community and even to marginalized groups to describe the exhaustion that may characterize their specific situations. It is most commonly used to refer to the experience of having an invisible disability, because people with no outward symptoms or symbols of their condition are often perceived as lazy, inconsistent or having poor time management skills by those who have no first-hand knowledge of living with a chronic illness or disability. Naomi Chainey has described how the term has also spread to use by some in the wider disability community, and how eventually the non-disabled community tried to appropriate it for other uses, to refer to non-chronic forms of fatigue and mental exhaustion – which she attributes to people with invisible disabilities being a sometimes marginalized group even within the disability community.

Those with mental health issues such as anxiety or depression may similarly find it challenging to go about seemingly simple tasks throughout the day, or to deal with a crisis. Spoon theory could even be used to show the exhaustion of having a newborn baby, as this situation often leads to a chronic lack of sleep on the part of the baby's caregiver(s).

== Related theories ==
As spoon theory has entered the lexicon of people with chronic illnesses, people with other experiences of illness, disability or other conditions that create an energy deficit have identified the aspects of living with a chronic illness that spoon theory does not capture. To explain these various experiences, the community has produced a multitude of related theories, including fork theory, knife theory, and matchstick theory.

=== Fork theory ===
While spoon theory establishes units of energy, fork theory focuses on the activities and how they can have varying levels of impact to the individual. Chronically ill people may encounter activities that produce little decrease in energy, as represented by smaller appetizer forks, or activities that can leave you feeling “stabby,” as represented by meat-shredding forks.

=== Knife theory ===
In combination with spoon theory, knife theory describes the sensation of “running out” of spoons and “borrowing” them from the next day. The chronic illness community compares this to grabbing a knife by the blade, because attempting to function with an energy deficit can often result in injuries or exacerbation of chronic fatigue symptoms.

=== Matchstick theory ===
As a response to the utensil theories, some have chosen instead to adopt matchstick theory. Matchstick theory conveys units of energy as matchsticks to convey that energy can be “finicky” and “unpredictable.”

== See also ==
- Ego depletion – Psychological theory
- Opportunity cost – Benefit lost by a choice between options

== Bibliography ==
- Alhaboby, Zhraa A.; Barnes, James; Evans, Hala; Short, Emma (2018). "Disability and Cyber-Victimization". In Schatz, J. L.; George, Amber E. (eds.). The Image of Disability: Essays on Media Representations. Jefferson, North Carolina: McFarland & Company. pp. 167ff. ISBN 978-1-4766-6945-8.
- Conrad, Sarah (2017). "Consider the Spoons: An Embodied Relational Approach to Incorporating Those with Persistent Fatigue into Eco-Activism". In Nocella, Anthony J.; George, Amber E.; Schatz, J. L. (eds.). The Intersectionality of Critical Animal, Disability, and Environmental Studies: Toward Eco-Ability, Justice, and Liberation. Lanham, Maryland: Lexington Books. pp. 79–97. ISBN 978-1-4985-3443-7.
- Gonzalez-Polledo, Elena (2016). "Chronic Media Worlds: Social Media and the Problem of Pain Communication on Tumblr". Social Media + Society. 2 (1) 2056305116628887: 205630511662888. doi:10.1177/2056305116628887. ISSN 2056-3051.
