= Censorship by X =

X, previously known as Twitter, has been involved in multiple controversies involving censorship of content, removing or omitting information from its services in order to comply with company policies, legal demands, and government censorship laws. They have come under criticism for limiting free speech online, particularly in nations with authoritarian governance.

Following the acquisition of Twitter in 2022 by Elon Musk and its eventual rebrand to X on July 23, 2023, censorship policies were changed by the new management under his ownership.

== Restrictions based on government request ==
X (formerly Twitter) acts on notice and take down complaints by third parties, including governments, to remove illegal content in accordance with the laws of the countries in which people use the service. On processing a successful complaint about an illegal post from "government officials, companies or another outside party", the social networking site will notify users from that country that they may not see it.

83% of government censorship requests by authoritarian governments were approved in the first year of Musk's ownership of Twitter, compared to 50% in 2022. In 2024, X disclosed 18,737 total account information requests by governments, 52.82% of which were approved. There were 72,703 account removal requests by governments, with 70.82% ultimately approved.

A 2025 study by the University of Edinburgh found that such restrictions were very impactful on the censored accounts as they significantly reduced accounts' engagements by 25%, and follower growth by 90%.

=== European Union and European Economic Area ===
On March 1, 2022, the Council of the European Union adopted a regulation to restrict the operations and broadcasting of certain Russian state-affiliated media in the EU as a response to Russia's invasion of Ukraine. Twitter complied with the EU to withhold content from at least 38 state-affiliated accounts of outlets like Russia Today, Sputnik, and Ruptly.

In July 2025, to comply with EU Digital Service, X uses Age Verify with ID or Photo Selfie for users to access sensitive content like pornography, similar to UK over Online Safety Act 2023.

=== France ===
Following the posting of antisemitic and racist posts by anonymous users, Twitter removed those posts from its service. Lawsuits were filed by the Union des étudiants juifs de France (UEJF), a French advocacy group and, on January 24, 2013, Judge Anne-Marie Sauteraud ordered Twitter to divulge the personally identifiable information about the user who posted the antisemitic post, charging that the posts violated French laws against hate speech. Twitter responded by saying that it was "reviewing its options" regarding the French charges. Twitter was given two weeks to comply with the court order before daily fines of €1,000 (about US$1,300) would be assessed. Issues over jurisdiction arise, because Twitter has no offices nor employees within France, so it is unclear how a French court could sanction Twitter. In July 2025, X uses Age Verify with ID or Photo Selfie for users to access sensitive content like pornography to comply with EU Digital Service.

=== Japan ===
Japan has been one of the top nations to make removal requests to Twitter/X since 2022, when they were responsible for 43% of all legal demands made to the company. This happened in the face of protests about humans rights, teacher's unions in Okinawa, and the censorship of a film about comfort women. In 2024, 64% of all removal requests came from the Japanese government and 79% of them were approved.

=== India ===
Accounts spoofing the Prime Minister of India such as "PM0India", "Indian-pm" and "PMOIndiaa" were blocked in India in August 2012 following violence in Assam.

During the curfew in Jammu and Kashmir after the revocation of the special status of Jammu and Kashmir on August 5, 2019, the Indian government approached Twitter to suspend accounts which were spreading rumours and anti-India content. This included the Twitter account of Syed Ali Shah Geelani, a Kashmiri separatist leader. On August 3, 2019, Geelani tweeted "India is about to launch the biggest genocide in the history of mankind", leading which, his account was suspended on request by authorities. Two days later, on August 5, the Indian parliament passed resolution to bifurcate the Jammu and Kashmir state into two union territories. A 2022 study found that the majority of accounts censored by India by July 2020 were related to this issue.

In February 2021, Twitter blocked hundreds of accounts that were posting about the Indian farmers protest from being accessed by users in India, by request of the Ministry of Home Affairs; the government ministry alleged that the accounts were spreading misinformation. Later that month, Twitter became subject to the national Social Media Ethics Code, which expects all social media companies operating in the country to remove content by request of the government within 36 hours, and appoint a local representative who is an Indian resident and passport holder.

On May 18, 2021, Bharatiya Janata Party national spokesperson Sambit Patra posted an image alleged to be from an internal Indian National Congress (INC) document, detailing a social media campaign against Prime Minister Narendra Modi to criticize his handling of the COVID-19 pandemic in India. The INC disputed the posts and claimed that they were fabricated. Twitter subsequently marked the post as containing manipulated media. The Ministry of Communications and Information Technology issued a request for Twitter to remove the label, alleging that Twitter's decision was "prejudged, prejudiced, and a deliberate attempt to colour the investigation by the local law enforcement agency". After Twitter refused to remove the label, its offices in New Delhi were raided by police.

In June 2021, Twitter lost its immunity as an "intermediary" under the Information Technology Act for its failure to appoint a local representative. It will be considered publisher of all materials posted on the platform. Later the same month, police in Uttar Pradesh registered a case against Twitter accusing it of distribution of child pornography. In March 2022, Delhi High Court questioned Twitter on why it would not block users posting objectionable content about Hindu Gods in the same way they blocked US President Donald Trump. The court sought a detailed explanation of Twitter's policies and asked them to file an affidavit.

In July 2022, Twitter started a lawsuit against the government of India after being ordered to remove multiple accounts and tweets that violated India's laws. Twitter is arguing that the laws are too restrictive and challenging the orders to block content. The company stated that some of the blocking demands "pertain to political content that is posted by official handles of political parties" and said that such orders are "a violation of the freedom of speech".

On August 19, 2023, Twitter suspended NewsClick's account. The following day, it suspended the account of The Kashmir Walla, a Kashmiri news portal.

=== Israel ===
In 2016, access to comments by the American blogger Richard Silverstein about a criminal investigation, which involved a minor and therefore was under a gag order according to Israeli law, was blocked to Israeli IP addresses, following a request by Israel's Ministry of Justice.

=== Pakistan ===
In May 2014, Twitter regularly disabled the ability to view specific "tweets" inside Pakistan, at the request of the government of Pakistan on the grounds that they were blasphemous, having done so five times in May.

On November 25, 2017, the NetBlocks internet shutdown observatory and Digital Rights Foundation collected evidence of nation-wide blocking of Twitter alongside other social media services, imposed by the government in response to the religious political party Tehreek-e-Labaik protests. The technical investigation found that all major Pakistani fixed-line and mobile service providers were affected by the restrictions, which were lifted by the PTA the next day when protests abated following the resignation of Minister for Law and Justice Zahid Hamid.

=== Russia ===
On May 19, 2014, Twitter blocked a pro-Ukrainian political account for Russian users. It happened soon after a Russian official had threatened to ban Twitter entirely if it refused to delete "tweets" that violated Russian law, according to the Russian news site Izvestia.

On July 27, 2014, Twitter blocked an account belonging to a hacker collective that has leaked several internal Kremlin documents to the Internet.

On March 10, 2021, Roskomnadzor began throttling Twitter on all mobile devices and 50% of computers due to claims that Twitter regulatory board failed to remove illegal content that includes suicide, child pornography, and drug use. They issued Twitter could be blocked in Russia if it did not comply. In an e-mail statement Twitter stated it was "deeply concerned to throttle online public conversation."

From March to April 2021, Roskomnadzor considered a ban and the removal of the IP of Twitter from Russia completely. The government agency was met with denials and lack of urgency from the social network. Roskomnadzor has the necessary “technical capabilities” to completely remove Twitter from Russian domain. The severity of the situation occurred when over 3,000 posts containing child pornography in violation of Community Guidelines have been detected in 2021 by the agency that was later sent to Twitter regulatory board for verification. However Twitter sent no response back to the agency concerning the illegal content and has thereafter been charged of withholding its duty to maintain the social network's Community Guidelines.

On April 2, 2021, a Russian court found Twitter guilty on three counts of "violating regulations on restricting unlawful content," and ordered Twitter to pay $117,000 in fines. On April 5, 2021, Russia extended its throttling of Twitter until May 15, 2021. On May 17, 2021, Roskomnadzor said that Twitter had removed 91% of the banned content and backed off on blocking Twitter. Barring 600 posts still pending removal, the government agency also said they would continue throttling Twitter on Mobile Devices only saying that Twitter needed to remove all the banned items and in the future delete reportedly illegal posts within 24 hours for all restrictions to be lifted.

=== South Korea ===
In August 2010, the government of South Korea tried to block certain content on Twitter due to the North Korean government opening a Twitter account. The North Korean Twitter account created on August 12, uriminzok, loosely translated to mean "our people" in Korean, acquired over 4,500 followers in less than one week. On August 19, 2010, South Korea's state-run Communications Standards Commission banned the Twitter account for broadcasting "illegal information." According to the BBC, experts claim that North Korea has invested in "information technology for more than 20 years" with knowledge of how to use social networking sites. This appeared to be "nothing new" for North Korea as the reclusive country has always published propaganda in its press, usually against South Korea, calling them "warmongers." With only 36 posts, the Twitter account was able to accumulate almost 9,000 followers. To date, the South Korean Commission has banned 65 sites, including the Twitter account.

=== Turkey ===
On April 20, 2014, Frankfurter Allgemeine Zeitung, FAZ, reported Twitter had blocked two regime hostile accounts in Turkey, @Bascalan and @Haramzadeler333, both known for pointing out corruption. In fact, on March 26, 2014, Twitter announced that it started to use its Country Withheld Content tool for the first time in Turkey. As of June 2014, Twitter was withholding 14 accounts and "hundreds of tweets" in Turkey.

Turkey submitted the highest volume of removal requests to Twitter in 2014, 2015, 2016, 2017 and 2018, while in 2019, it was third. As of 2017, Twitter reported that the government of Turkey accounted for more than 52 percent of all content removal requests worldwide. A 2021 study reported that most accounts withheld in Turkey were affiliated or supportive of PKK, YPG, and Gülen Movement.

Two days before Turkey's 2023 election on May 14th, Twitter restricted access to "some content in Turkey." According to critics, the measure affected profiles "denouncing corruption in Erdogan’s and his party’s entourage, some pro-Kurdish accounts and others making critical comments about the 2016 coup."

=== United Kingdom ===
In July 2025, to comply with Online Safety Act 2023, X uses Age Verify with ID or Photo Selfie for users to access sensitive content like pornography, similar to EU and EEA over EU Digital Service.

=== Venezuela ===
Twitter images were temporarily blocked in Venezuela in February 2014, along with other sites used to share images, including Pastebin.com and Zello, a walkie-talkie app. In response to the block, Twitter offered Venezuelan users a workaround to use their accounts via text messaging on their mobile phones.

On February 27, 2019, internet monitoring group NetBlocks reported the blocking of Twitter by state-run Internet provider CANTV for a duration of 40 minutes. The disruption followed the sharing of a tweet made by opposition leader Juan Guaidó linking to a highly critical recording posted to SoundCloud, which was also restricted access during the incident. The outages were found to be consistent with a pattern of brief, targeted filtering of other social platforms established during the country's presidential crisis.

== Restrictions on adult content ==
Beginning in July 2025, in order to comply with the Online Safety Act 2023 in the United Kingdom and the Digital Services Act in the European Union, X introduced mandatory ID verification for European users seeking to access adult content on the platform.

== Suspending and restricting users ==
Under its Terms of Service which require user agreement, the platform retains the right to temporarily or permanently suspend user accounts based on violations. Excluding the removal of spam accounts, 5.3 million accounts were suspended on X in the first six months of 2024, over three times the 1.6 million accounts that were suspended in the first six months of 2022. Accounts were removed for various violations of community guidelines via human or autonomous review.

One such example took place on December 18, 2017, when it banned the accounts belonging to Paul Golding, Jayda Fransen, Britain First, and the Traditionalist Worker Party. Then-President of the United States Donald Trump faced a limited degree of censorship in 2019. Trump has used the platform extensively as a means of communication, and has escalated tensions with other nations through his tweets. Following the January 6 United States Capitol attack, Twitter permanently suspended Trump's personal Twitter account on January 8, 2021, at 6:21 EST. (Note: On November 20, 2022, Elon Musk lifted Trump's ban.) Trump then posted four status updates on the presidential @POTUS Twitter account which were subsequently removed. Twitter said they would not suspend government accounts, but will "instead take action to limit their use."

On December 15, 2022, Twitter suspended 10 journalist accounts who had written about the company and its new owner Elon Musk, initially without explanation. Musk later cited the amplification of the account @ElonJet as the reason for the retributions. The suspensions were condemned by representatives of several countries and organizations, including the United Nations and the European Union.

== Semi-censorship ==
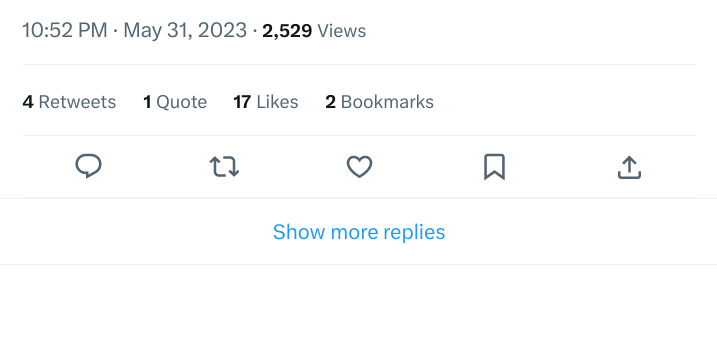
Posts are often hidden underneath "Show more replies". The semi-censorship can occur without the respective tweet violating any policy and without the user being given any explanation.

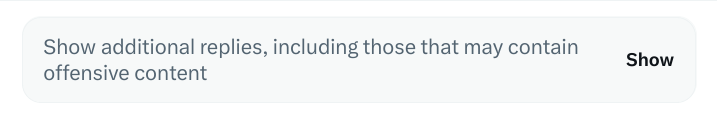
The content that is displayed instead of the hidden tweets. In many cases, tweets that do not contain any offensive language or e.g. inconvenient truths that offend some users are also hidden underneath this message.

Twitter's policies have been described as subject to manipulation by users who may coordinate to flag politically controversial tweets as allegedly violating the platform's policies, resulting in deplatforming of controversial users or users who made tweets they object to. The platform has long been criticized for its failure to provide details of underlying alleged policy violations to the subjects of Twitter suspensions and bans.

In 2018, the platform introduced hiding tweets from certain accounts in conversations and search results under "Show more replies". When Twitter's software decides that a certain user is "detract[ing] from the conversation", that user's tweets will be hidden from search results and public conversations until an unspecified change occurs, with the user not being made aware that they're being semi-censored in this way or why. Studies have called the hiding 'reply deboosting' and found that 6.2% of the 41,092 existing accounts in their dataset had been shadow banned at least once during the study period. As of 2023, there is no place to report unwarranted hiding of tweets, nor are there any measures to ensure hiding is not arbitrary or for questionable purposes such as commercial interests. Through these and other features, platforms like Twitter conduct an intransparent 'management of visibilities' that steers and nudges audiences in more or less subtle ways.

For several years, many social media users have expressed concerns about algorithmic suppression. A number of those users may have collected specific tweets that have been hidden. Nevertheless, according to a 2022 news report, "[s]ocial-media companies deny quietly suppressing content". A study crawled more than 2.5 million Twitter profiles and found that nearly one in 40 had their tweets hidden. Tweets hidden this way do not show up in the notifications of the person replied to and most people browsing a Twitter thread may not click the button to see additional replies. A study about practices of 'silencing' users on social media suggests that that algorithms play a critical role in steering online attention on social media has implications for algorithmic accountability. In 2022, it was reported that Musk didn't clarify what metrics Twitter might use to determine if a tweet may be "wrong and bad" or "destructive to the world". He clarified "Freedom of speech doesn't mean freedom of reach", which may underline how he and the platform can continue to hide or deboost any content for any unspecified reasons.

=== Incidents ===
In 2018, Twitter rolled out a "quality filter" that hid content and users deemed "low quality" from search results and limited their visibility, leading to accusations of shadow banning. After conservatives claimed it censors users from the political right, Alex Thompson, a writer for VICE, confirmed that many prominent Republican politicians had been "shadow banned" by the filter. Twitter later acknowledged the problem, stating that the filter had a software bug that would be fixed in the near future.

In October 2020, Twitter prevented users from tweeting about a New York Post article about the Biden–Ukraine conspiracy theory, relating to emails about Hunter Biden allegedly introducing a Ukrainian businessman to his father, Joe Biden. Senators Marsha Blackburn and Ted Cruz described the blocking of the New York Post on Twitter as "election interference". The New York Times reported in September 2021 that a Federal Election Commission inquiry into a complaint about the matter found Twitter had acted with a valid commercial reason, rather than a political purpose. The FEC inquiry also found that allegations Twitter had violated election laws by allegedly shadow banning Republicans and other means were "vague, speculative and unsupported by the available information."

In 2023, under Elon Musk's ownership, posts containing the keyword "Substack" were temporarily restricted, and liking, sharing and searching for such tweets were prevented. Matt Taibbi, a Twitter Files author, was also temporarily shadow banned.

== See also ==
- Criticism of Twitter
- Censorship by Apple
- Censorship by Facebook
- Censorship by Google
- Censorship by TikTok
- Issues involving social networking services
- Twitter suspensions
