= Criticism of X (social network) =

X, formerly known as Twitter, has faced various criticisms over the years, particularly concerning content moderation, censorship, and platform management.

Twitter has faced intensified controversy since the company's acquisition by Elon Musk (in October 2022). Issues such as handling of misinformation and disinformation, proliferation of hate speech, suspension of journalists' accounts, and temporary measures like labeling media outlets as "state-affiliated" and restricting their visibility have sparked criticism. Twitter continues to struggle with challenges such as viral misinformation, hate speech, and antisemitism controversies.

Twitter is also blocked by several governments. Currently, X is blocked in six countries around the world: China, Iran, Myanmar, North Korea, Russia and Turkmenistan.

== Older Twitter criticisms and controversies ==
In June 2009, after being criticized by Kanye West and sued by Tony La Russa over unauthorized accounts run by impersonators, the company launched their "Verified Accounts" program.

In 2016, Twitter announced the creation of the Twitter Trust & Safety Council to help "ensure that people feel safe expressing themselves on Twitter". The council's inaugural members included 50 organizations and individuals. The announcement of Twitter's "Trust & Safety Council" was met with objection from parts of its userbase. Critics accused the member organizations of being heavily skewed towards "the restriction of hate speech" and a Reason article expressed concern that "there's not a single uncompromising anti-censorship figure or group on the list".

Twitter's policies have been described as subject to manipulation by users who may coordinate to flag politically controversial tweets as allegedly violating the platform's policies, resulting in deplatforming of controversial users or users who made tweets they object to. The platform has long been criticized for its failure to provide details of underlying alleged policy violations to the subjects of Twitter suspensions and bans.

In 2018, Twitter rolled out a "quality filter" that hid content and users deemed "low quality" from search results and limited their visibility, leading to accusations of shadow banning. After conservatives claimed it censors users from the political right, Alex Thompson, a writer for VICE, confirmed that many prominent Republican politicians had been "shadow banned" by the filter. Twitter later acknowledged the problem, stating that the filter had a software bug that would be fixed in the near future.

In October 2020, Twitter prevented users from tweeting about a New York Post article about the Biden–Ukraine conspiracy theory, relating to emails about Hunter Biden allegedly introducing a Ukrainian businessman to his father, Joe Biden. Senators Marsha Blackburn and Ted Cruz described the blocking of the New York Post on Twitter as "election interference". The New York Times reported in September 2021 that a Federal Election Commission inquiry into a complaint about the matter found Twitter had acted with a valid commercial reason, rather than a political purpose. The FEC inquiry also found that allegations Twitter had violated election laws by allegedly shadow banning Republicans and other means were "vague, speculative and unsupported by the available information."

== Criticisms and controversies since acquisition by Elon Musk ==
=== Criticism of rebranding ===
The rebranding itself (which happened in July 2023) has been criticized on the basis that the trademarkability of the name and logo is weak: there are almost 900 companies in the U.S. that own an X trademark, including an existing social media-related logo owned by Meta Platforms.

=== Handling of misinformation and disinformation ===
Elon Musk himself had been critical of Twitter's moderation of misinformation prior to his acquisition of the company. However, since the acquisition of Twitter by Elon Musk, the platform has been criticized for enabling the increased spread of disinformation. After the transition, Musk eliminated the misinformation moderation team, and stopped enforcing its policy on labeling tweets with misleading information about coronavirus. Algorithm changes promoted viral disinformation about the Russian invasion of Ukraine, and led to significant gains in followers for media outlets affiliated with Russia, China and Iran. While Twitter had joined a voluntary program under the European Union's to fight disinformation in June 2022, Musk pulled the company out of the program in May 2023.

As of September 2023, X relied exclusively on its Community Notes program to combat misinformation, leading to failures in labeling misinformation. The program has become responsible for spreading misinformation as well as delays in fact-checking. A European Commission study found that disinformation was most prevalent and received the highest relative engagement on X, compared to other major social networks, leading to warnings of a potential ban or fines by the EU for non-compliance with the Digital Services Act.

In October 2023, media outlets and experts observed significant disinformation related to the 2023 Israel–Hamas war. A BBC journalist described a "deluge" of false information, including by "blue tick" accounts, and CNBC found that while some videos were flagged as "misleading or false", identical re-posts remained unflagged. Despite Hamas being banned on Twitter as a terrorist organization, some of its propaganda videos have circulated on the platform.

An analysis from NewsGuard found that Verified users, described as "superspreaders of misinformation", produced 74% of the most viral misinformation related to the Gaza war during the first week of the conflict. The study analyzed 250 of the most-engaged posts on Twitter, based on the most popular false or unsubstantiated claims, that had received over 100 million views and one million engagements from users. On December 18, 2023, the European Union announced it would be taking action against Twitter over the spread of disinformation.

=== Increase in hate speech ===
Following Musk's acquisition of Twitter, multiple organizations reported a rise in hate speech on the platform, including the Center for Countering Digital Hate, the Anti-Defamation League, and a research group at Tufts University. The Center for Countering Digital Hate report found that anti-Black slurs appeared on Twitter at nearly three times the rate they had prior to the acquisition and that homophobic and transphobic slurs had risen by 52% and 62% respectively. According to a study by Montclair State University, as of January 2026 the use of the "r-word", a slur referring to intellectual disability, had increased on X by more than 2000% since Musk's acquisition. Academics and researchers studied the spread of hate speech on Twitter primarily by accessing the Twitter API, which was shut down in February 2023. According to a Reuters survey, this removal led to the modification or cancellation of more than 100 ongoing studies.

According to the Institute of Strategic Dialogue (ISD), from June 2022 to February 2023, the number of anti-semitic tweets doubled on the platform, with removal of such content also increasing, while the number of Islamic State accounts had also increased by 70%. In March, a study from the BBC found a third of the 1,100 reinstated accounts appeared to have violated Twitter guidelines. Twitter insiders told BBC Panorama they were struggling to protect users from trolling and harassment, including misogynistic online hate, and the targeting of rape survivors.

From a study of over 1 million tweets since 2022, the Center for Countering Digital Hate (CCDH) reported that posts associating LGBT people with "grooming" increased by 119% since October 2022, with advertising also appearing alongside what many deemed anti-LGBT rhetoric. The study featured five high-profile accounts including Libs of TikTok, Christopher Rufo, Tim Pool, and James Lindsay. Media monitoring group GLAAD described Twitter as "the most dangerous platform for LGBTQ people" with X ranking lowest on its Social Media Safety Index.

In November 2023, the CCDH released a new report claiming 98% of misinformation, antisemitism, Islamophobia, and other hate speech, in relation to the Israel-Hamas war, remained on X after 7 days of reporting, generating over 24 million views, and that the community failed to provide measures against reported hateful conduct. X responded by detailing the removal of 3,000 accounts and taking action against 325,000 pieces of content, such as restricting the reach of a post. On November 24, the European Union halted advertisements on X referring to an "alarming increase" in hate speech and misinformation. A spokesperson for the European Commission confirmed that X is affected by the EU rules, and has advised European institutions to abstain from advertising on the platform.

Following the Dublin riots in Ireland on November 23, X faced criticism for allowing "vile messages" on the platform, described as hate speech, while other social media platforms, TikTok, Instagram, and Facebook, complied with Garda requests for taking down content. After Prime Minister Leo Varadkar called for incitement to hatred legislation to be updated, Musk responded by stating "the Irish PM hates the Irish people".

Following the 2025 Bondi Beach shooting, an official inquiry by Australia's Royal Commission on Antisemitism and Social Cohesion found that X was a "key perpetrator in the proliferation of antisemitic hate in the online environment."

=== Child sexual abuse material ===
In August 2023, it was reported that child sexual abuse material (CSAM) on Twitter was still an issue, despite statements by Musk that removing it was a top priority. As of June 2023, an investigation by the Stanford Internet Observatory at Stanford University reported "a lapse in basic enforcement" against CSAM by Twitter within "recent months". The number of staff on Twitter's trust and safety teams were reduced, for example, leaving one full-time staffer to handle all child sexual abuse material in the Asia-Pacific region in November 2022. A 2023 investigation by BBC Panorama found concerns that child sexual abuse was rising, following the layoffs and changes at Twitter since Musk's takeover.

=== Malicious and fake accounts ===
In March 2024, The Intelligencer reported on the proliferation of spam posts containing the phrase "░P░U░S░S░Y░I░N░B░I░O░", or similar references to pornographic content appearing in the poster's bio, apparently formatted so as to evade counter-spam measures. The commonality of "pussy in bio" or "PIB" spam made it fodder for jokes, including one posted by Elon Musk himself. The Intelligencer further noted that most of the accounts that posted this spam were short-lived throwaway accounts, and that links provided by the accounts typically routed users through several layers of redirecting websites, ultimately landing on a provider of simulated sex chats.

=== Account suspensions and reinstatements ===
Within hours of the takeover in October 2022, the far-right Britain First account, previously banned in 2017, was reinstated. Account bans continued to be lifted in late November 2022, beginning with Jordan Peterson, Kathy Griffin, The Babylon Bee, and Donald Trump. Multiple accounts were suspended, many of which had been named by far-right figures who urged Musk to take action. Among those banned include a group that provided security to LGBTQ+ events, and several accounts parodying Musk.

In November, Twitter analytics firm Bot Sentinel calculated that around 877,000 accounts were deactivated and 497,000 were suspended between October 28 and November 1, over double the usual number. In December, neo-Nazi and founder of The Daily Stormer Andrew Anglin was reinstated, within 24 hours of Kanye West's suspension after posting an antisemitic tweet. Kanye's account was later restored in July 2023.

In May 2023, Musk announced Twitter would delete accounts that have been inactive for several years, including accounts of dead people. This led to criticism, mainly from those who charged it would disallow them from reading tweets written by their deceased loved ones.

In June 2023 Twitter suspended the accounts of Musk/Tesla critic Aaron Greenspan and his legal transparency company PlainSite. PlainSite had released a number of Musk/Tesla-related documents over the years. In February 2023 Musk had sued Greenspan over communications between the two being published.

In January 2024, X banned accounts belonging to several journalists and left-leaning accounts, including Ken Klippenstein.

In August 2024, a Brazilian Supreme Court judge cautioned that social media platform X might face suspension if Elon Musk did not appoint a new legal representative for Brazil within 24 hours, in relation to issues over the reinstatement of Brazilian accounts that had been suspended under a court order. Musk had earlier paused X's business operations in the country and criticized Judge Alexandre de Moraes for his efforts against disinformation. If Musk failed to comply, the platform could be suspended, which happened on late August 2024, being lifted after the municipal elections on early October 2024, after the social network appointed a representative in Brazil, blocked the accounts as requested by justice and paid R$28.6 past due in fines applied to X.

In 2024 and 2025 amid anti-government protests in Turkey, X took down the content and accounts of a large number of grassroots activists at the request of the Turkish government. This led to criticism of X's decision making.

==== ElonJet and journalists suspended ====
Avatar of Elon Musk

Elon Musk
(@elonmusk)
tweeted:

Any account doxxing real-time location info of anyone will be suspended, as it is a physical safety violation. This includes posting links to sites with real-time location info. Posting locations someone traveled to on a slightly delayed basis isn't a safety problem, so is ok.

December 15, 2022

On December 14, Musk suspended ElonJet, a Twitter bot account operated by Jack Sweeney which tracked Musk's private jet in real-time using publicly accessible data, in addition to several of Sweeney's other accounts. He had previously stated, "My commitment to free speech extends even to not banning the account following my plane, even though that is a direct personal safety risk." Defending his decision to suspend the accounts, Musk declared a ban on doxxing real-time location data, and Twitter followed suit by updating its policies page.

The next day, Twitter banned the accounts of multiple journalists who had been covering the ElonJet incident, as well as the Mastodon account on Twitter, on the grounds that they had violated the new doxing policy. Some of the suspended journalists joined a Twitter Spaces mass audio call with Musk, where Musk was asked about their suspensions; Musk quit the call, and the call was abruptly ended before the entire Twitter Spaces service was temporarily taken down. Musk attributed the shutdown to a software bug, while a Twitter senior software engineer said that Spaces had been "taken offline". Most suspended journalists were later reinstated, but found themselves unable to post new tweets until their policy-violating tweets had been taken down.

=== State-affiliated media labeling ===
On April 6, 2023, Twitter reversed its official policy stating that the platform would not "recommend or amplify" the content of state-controlled media entities. According to an analysis by the Digital Forensic Research Lab, the change had already taken effect since around March 29, when Twitter stopped filtering government accounts in Russia, China and Iran. These accounts, such as those managed by Russia's RT, have a significant presence on the platform. Following the change, which enabled the accounts to be algorithmically promoted by Twitter, their follower count quickly rose.

Also in April 2023, Twitter designated National Public Radio's main account as "US state-affiliated media", a label that was typically reserved for foreign media outlets that directly represented the point of view of their respective governments, like Russia's RT and China's Xinhua. Twitter's decision was controversial; though established by an act of Congress, NPR is an independent news organization that only receives a fraction of its funding through government programs. Twitter's previous policy had explicitly mentioned NPR, as well as the United Kingdom's BBC, as examples of networks that were not considered state-affiliated due to their editorial independence. NPR ceased activity on its main Twitter account in response to the designation. As of October 2023, NPR still no longer uses Twitter, with the media outlet describing the effects on traffic as negligible.

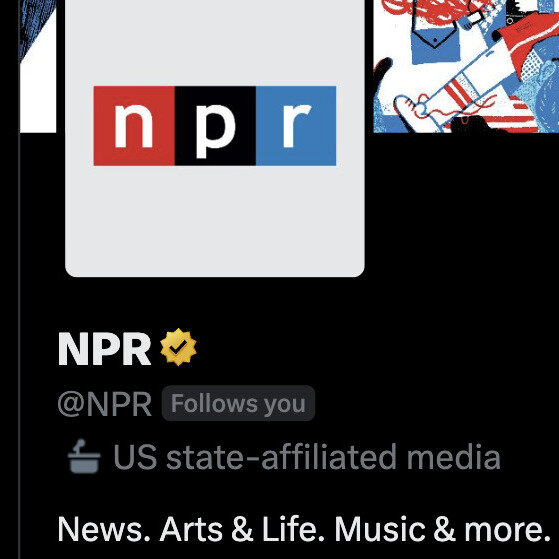
NPR labeled state-affiliated media

On April 8, 2023, Twitter changed the designation of NPR's account from "state-affiliated" to "government-funded". On April 10, after managing to get in contact with Musk himself, NPR reporter Bobby Allyn tweeted that Musk said he was relying on a list accessible through a Wikipedia category page, named "Category:Publicly funded broadcasters", to determine which news organizations' accounts should be deemed as "government-funded media". Twitter then added the label to other sources such as PBS, the BBC, and Voice of America, which all three objected to.

On April 12, NPR announced that its accounts would no longer be active on Twitter, citing the platform's "inaccurate and misleading" labeling of NPR as "government-funded media" despite the fact that it receives "less than 1 percent of its $300 million annual budget" from the Corporation for Public Broadcasting. As their last post on the platform, the network shared links to their alternative newsletters, websites and social media profiles. In an email to the staff explaining the decision, CEO John Lansing allowed individual NPR journalists and staffers to choose for themselves whether to keep using Twitter, while noting that remaining on the site "would be a disservice to the serious work you all do here".

On April 17, Canadian public broadcaster CBC was designated as "government-funded media" by Twitter, in response to a letter from Conservative Party of Canada leader Pierre Poilievre. On April 18, the label was changed to "70% government-funded media", referring to outdated data from the CBC's 2020–2021 report; shortly afterwards, Musk tweaked the percentage in the label to "69%". Musk tweeted "Canadian Broadcasting Corp said they're 'less than 70% government-funded', so we corrected the label". In response, CBC announced they would pause Twitter activity.

On April 21, Twitter stopped labeling state-affiliated media entirely, with neither Western publicly funded outlets such as NPR, BBC and CBC, nor China's Xinhua and Russia's RT, displaying the label on their accounts.

=== Hateful conduct and language regarding transgender people ===
After previously indicating his intention to review Twitter's policy against "misgendering or deadnaming of transgender individuals", Musk relaxed the platform's hate speech policies in November 2022, with Gizmodo describing the policy protecting transgender people as "effectively dead". While previously tweets would be removed, Twitter announced it would instead place warning labels on tweets that are "potentially" in violation of its hateful conduct policy in April 2023.

On June 1, the first day of Pride Month, Musk confirmed that a policy against misgendering wouldn't be enforced, and that in his opinion "Whether or not you agree with using someone’s preferred pronouns, not doing so is at most rude and certainly breaks no laws".

In June, Musk promoted the film What Is a Woman? by The Daily Wire, after a Twitter review determined the content promoted hateful conduct, and was therefore in violation of abuse and harassment policies. Musk claimed the objection to the film was "a mistake", but that it wouldn't be promoted across the platform. After a pressure campaign from users, the restrictions were reduced to simply not being placed next to advertising. Shortly after, Musk declared that the words "cis" and "cisgender" are considered slurs on Twitter, within the context of repeated and targeted harassment. In October, the ability to report allegations of transphobic abuse had been scrapped.

In November, PragerU would buy a "timeline takeover" advertising spot, which forces an advertisement and accompanying hashtag to be seen by most Twitter users regardless of demographics or preferences for 24 hours, to promote their short film Detrans: The Dangers of Gender-Affirming Care; the "timeline takeover" spot was part of PragerU's estimated $1 million marketing budget for the short film. The Nation describes "anti-trans hatred" as one of Twitter's "core features".

=== API-related issues ===
In January 2023, Twitter ended third-party access to its APIs, forcing all third-party Twitter clients to shut down. This broke the third-party clients, but the change was not acknowledged until a week later, when the company cited unspecified "long-standing API rules" as the reason for the change. By January 19, Twitter had retroactively updated its developer agreement, barring developers from creating products similar to Twitter's own app. On February 2, Twitter announced it would be removing the free tier of its API by February 9 and replace it with a "basic paid tier". Musk later clarified on February 5, that bot accounts that provided "good content" would be permitted to continue using Twitter's API.

This was controversial among the developer community, as many third-party apps predated the company's official apps, and the change was not announced beforehand. Twitterrific's Sean Heber confirmed in a blog post that the 16-year-old app has been discontinued. "We are sorry to say that the app's sudden and undignified demise is due to an unannounced and undocumented policy change by an increasingly capricious Twitter – a Twitter that we no longer recognize as trustworthy nor want to work with any longer."

=== Promotion of Elon Musk's tweets ===
On February 7, 2023, Elon Musk convened a meeting of Twitter engineers and advisors to address the decline in engagement with his own tweets. One of the company's two principal engineers, after suggesting that public interest in Musk was waning following a peak during his acquisition of the platform, was fired. A Google Trends chart presented by employees had showed a decline in popularity. The following week, after the Super Bowl LVII, Twitter employee James Musk, who is Elon's paternal cousin, sent a message to the company's engineers concerning a "high-urgency" matter: that Elon Musk's tweet about the Super Bowl had received fewer impressions than one sent by US president Joe Biden. By that afternoon, Twitter's algorithm had been altered to artificially boost Musk's tweets by a factor of 1,000. Many users observed an overwhelming promotion of his posts in the "For You" tab. Following criticism, the boost was lessened to a smaller factor.

=== Content suppression and censorship ===
Despite claiming to be a non-biased "digital town square" and a champion for freedom of speech. Twitter delivers little or no search results, when searching for topics that are in opposition of the company or Elon's values and interests. Tags like "Chudai" and "Wataa" (in the form of words, not hashtags) are used to bypass those restrictions.

=== Image editing tool ===
On December 29, 2025, Elon Musk have announced an on-site feature that would allow any user to take other's images and edit them without consent. Users voiced their concerns of art theft and deepfake photographs. Boichi, a South Korean Illustrator, voiced his frustration with the feature, and stated he would no longer be posting on X.

In December 2025, Bloomberg reported that X users found Grok would comply with unconsensual requests to digitally undress individuals, including minors, or show them performing sexually explicit acts. The majority of these prompts were targeted at women and girls. An analysis of 20,000 images generated by Grok between December 25, 2025, and January 1, 2026, showed 2% were of people in bikinis or transparent clothes and appeared to be 18 or younger, including 30 of "young or very young" women or girls. A separate analysis conducted over 24 hours from January 5 to 6 calculated that users had Grok create 6,700 sexually suggestive or nudified images per hour.

== Government blocking of Twitter/X access ==
X is also blocked by several governments. X is currently blocked in seven countries around the world: China, Iran, Myanmar, North Korea, Russia, and Turkmenistan.

== Response from Twitter/X ==
In response to allegations it deemed unfair, X Corp. has pursued legal action against nonprofit organizations such as Media Matters and the Center for Countering Digital Hate.

== See also ==
- Criticism of Facebook
- Criticism of Tesla, Inc.
