= Mass media and American politics =

Mass media and American politics covers the role of newspapers, magazines, radio, television, and social media from the colonial era to the present.

== Colonial and Revolutionary eras ==
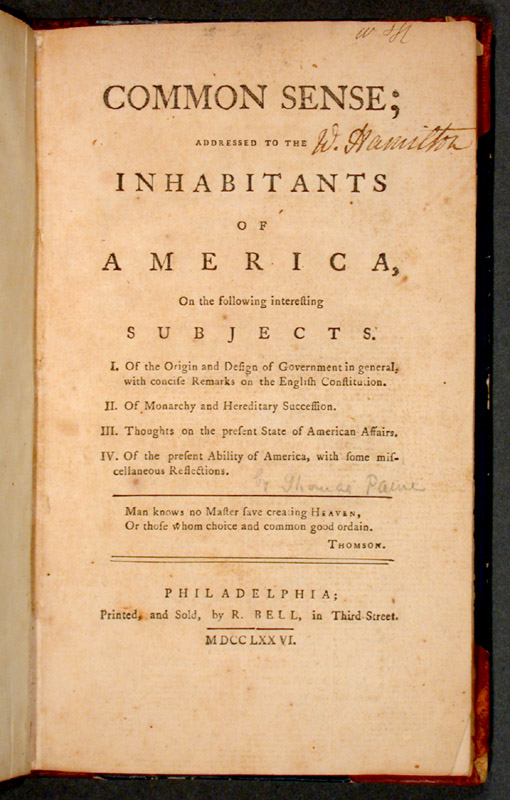

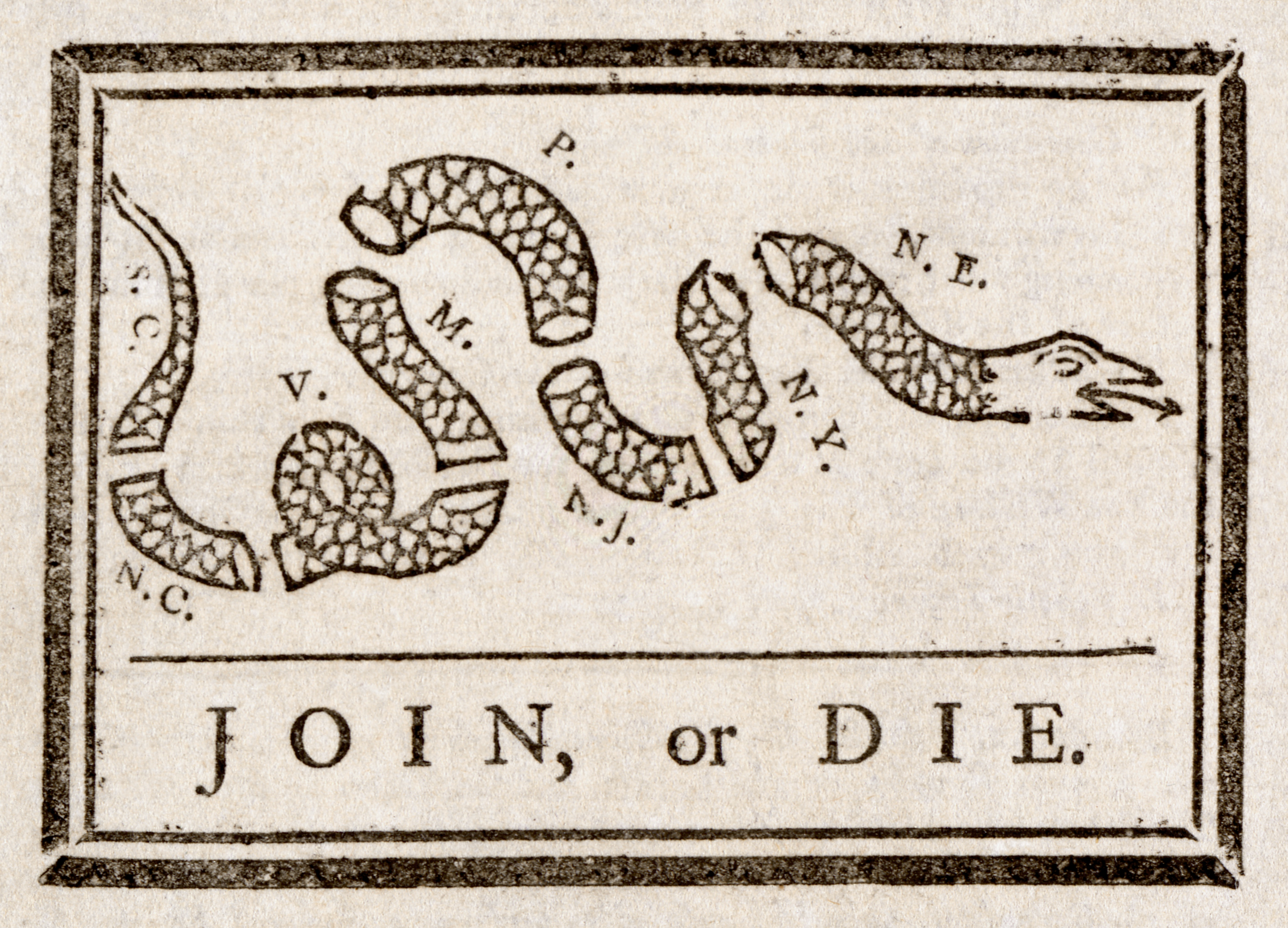
Join, or Die by Benjamin Franklin

The first newspapers appeared in major port cities such as Philadelphia, New York, Boston, and Charleston in order to provide merchants with the latest trade news. They typically copied any news that was received from other newspapers, or from the London press. The editors discovered they could criticize the local governor and gain a bigger audience; the governor discovered he could shut down the newspapers. The most dramatic confrontation came in New York in 1734, where the governor brought John Peter Zenger to trial for criminal libel after his paper published some satirical attacks. Zenger's lawyers argued that truth was a defense against libel and the jury acquitted Zenger, who became the iconic American hero for freedom of the press. The result was an emerging tension between the media and the government. Literacy was widespread in America, with over half of the white men able to read. The illiterates often could hear newspapers read aloud at local taverns. By the mid-1760s, there were 24 weekly newspapers in the 13 colonies (only New Jersey was lacking one), and the satirical attack on government became common practice in American newspapers. The French and Indian war (1757–63) was the featured topic of many newspaper stories, giving the colonials a broader view of American affairs. Benjamin Franklin, already famous as a printer in Philadelphia published one of the first editorial cartoons, Join, or Die, calling on the colonies to join together to defeat the French. By reprinting news originating in other papers, colonial printers created a private network for evaluating and disseminating news for the whole colonial world. Franklin took the lead, and eventually had two dozen newspapers in his network. The network played a major role in organizing opposition to the Stamp Act, and in organizing and embolding the Patriots in the 1770s.

Colonial newspaper networks played a major role in fomenting the American Revolution, starting with their attack on the Stamp Act of 1765. They provided essential news of what was happening locally and in other colonies, and they provided the arguments used by the patriots, to Voice their grievances such as "No taxation without representation!" The newspapers also printed and sold pamphlets, such as the phenomenally successful Common Sense (1776), which destroyed the king's prestige and jelled Patriot opinion overnight in favor of independence. Neutrality became impossible, and the few Loyalist newspapers were hounded and ceased publication when the war began. However, the British controlled important cities for varying periods of time, including New York City, 1776 to 1783. They sponsored a Loyalist press that vanished in 1783.

== New nation, 1780s–1820s ==
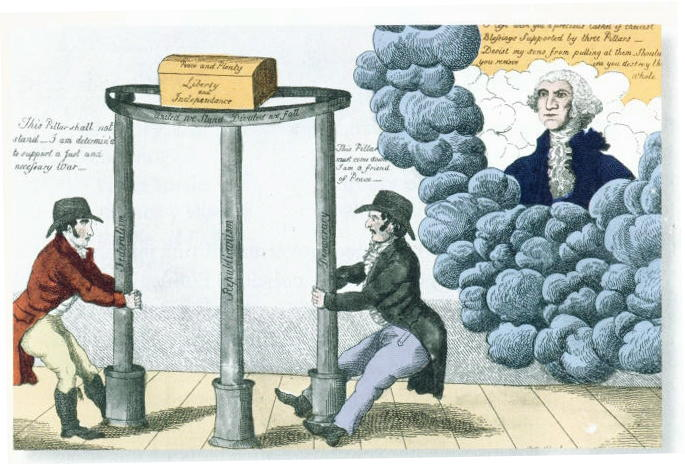
Federalist poster about 1800. Washington (in heaven) tells partisans to keep the pillars of Federalism, Republicanism and Democracy.

With the formation of the first two political parties in the 1790s, Both parties set up national networks of newspapers to provide a flow of partisan news and information for their supporters. The newspapers also printed pamphlets, flyers, and ballots that voters could simply drop in the ballot box.

By 1796, both parties had a national network of newspapers, which attacked each other vehemently. The Federalist and Republican newspapers of the 1790s traded vicious barbs against their enemies.

The most heated rhetoric came in debates over the French Revolution, especially the Jacobin Terror of 1793–94 when the guillotine was used daily. Nationalism was a high priority, and the editors fostered an intellectual nationalism typified by the Federalist effort to stimulate a national literary culture through their clubs and publications in New York and Philadelphia, and through Federalist Noah Webster's efforts to simplify and Americanize the language.

At the height of political passion came in 1798 as the Federalists in Congress passed the four Alien and Sedition Acts. The fourth Act made it a federal crime to publish "any false, scandalous, or malicious writing or writings against the Government of the United States, with intent to defame... Or to bring them... into contempt or disrepute." Two dozen men were charged with felonies for violating the Sedition Act, chiefly newspaper editors from the Jeffersonian Republican Party. The act expired in 1801.

== Second Party System: 1830s–1850s ==
Both parties relied heavily on their national network of newspapers. Some editors were the key political players in their states, and most of them filled their papers with useful information on rallies and speeches and candidates, as well as the text of major speeches and campaign platforms.

== Third Party System: 1850s–1890s ==
Newspapers continued their role as the main internal communication system for the Army-style campaigns of the era. The goal was not to convince independents, who are few in number, but to rally all the loyal party members to the polls by making them enthusiastic about the party's platform, and apprehensive about the enemy.

Nearly all weekly and daily papers were party organs until the early 20th century. Thanks to Hoe's invention of high-speed rotary presses for city papers, and free postage for rural sheets, newspapers proliferated. In 1850, the Census counted 1,630 party newspapers (with a circulation of about one per voter), and only 83 "independent" papers. The party line was behind every line of news copy, not to mention the authoritative editorials, which exposed the 'stupidity' of the enemy and the 'triumphs' of the party in every issue. Editors were senior party leaders, and often were rewarded with lucrative postmasterships. Top publishers, such as Horace Greeley, Whitelaw Reid, Schuyler Colfax, Warren Harding and James Cox were nominated on the national ticket. After 1900, William Randolph Hearst, Joseph Pulitzer and other big city politician-publishers discovered they could make far more profit through advertising, at so many dollars per thousand readers. By becoming non-partisan they expanded their base to include the opposition party and the fast-growing number of consumers who read the ads but were less and less interested in politics. There was less and less political news after 1900, apparently because citizens became more apathetic, and shared their partisan loyalties with the new professional sports teams that attracted larger and larger audiences.

Nebraska congressman, William Jennings Bryan, was nominated for the White House after his "Cross of Gold" speech. He championed free silver, populism, and wealth distribution. Despite facing opposition from supporters of the gold standard, industrial progress, and financial conservatism, Bryan aimed to win the White House through a dramatic speaking campaign Newspapers published transcripts of William Jennings Bryan's speech, gaining support from struggling farmers and laborers during the 1890s economic depression. In the 1900 campaign, Bryan faced off against President McKinley, with intense media coverage. In the 1908 campaign, he faced off against Republican candidate Taft, embracing new forms of media like radio and motion pictures. The media played a crucial role in shaping public opinion, with some outlets criticizing and others promoting Bryan's message.

== Progressive era ==
The American Newspaper industry during this era had been massively expanding. The number of English-language newspapers had nearly tripled during this time. Technology had a hand to do with this because of faster printing presses, and more efficient transportation. Newspapers such as the New York World and the New York Journal appealed to a wide variety of audiences with pages devoted to finances, sports, women, entertainment, etc. Special Interest newspapers were also on the rise during this period with many different groups pushing their agenda through newspapers and other forms of media. These special interest newspapers include the National American Woman Suffrage Association's Woman's Journal, The Anti-Saloon League's American Issue, and others. There even came a time that there was up to nine publications in the major cities such as Chicago, Boston, and New York which in turn created fierce competition. Competition caused these publications to lower their prices to just a penny just to stay afloat.

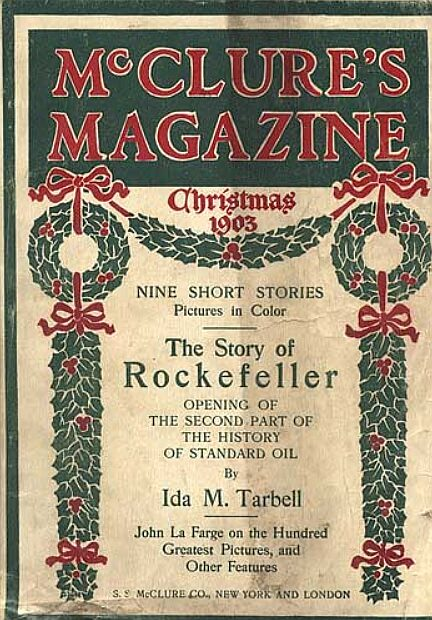

Magazines were not a new medium but they became much more popular around 1900, some with circulations in the hundreds of thousands of subscribers. Thanks to the rapid expansion of national advertising, the cover price fell sharply to about 10 cents. One cause was the heavy coverage of corruption in politics, local government and big business, especially by Muckrakers. They were journalists in the Progressive Era (1890s–1920s) who wrote for popular magazines to expose social and political sins and shortcomings. They relied on their own investigative journalism reporting; muckrakers often worked to expose social ills and corporate and political corruption. Muckraking magazines–notably McClure's–took on corporate monopolies and crooked political machines while raising public awareness of chronic urban poverty, unsafe working conditions, and social issues like child labor. These Journalists were nicknamed muckrakers by Theodore Roosevelt because he complained they were being disruptive by raking up the muck.

Ray Stannard Baker, George Creel, and Brand Whitlock specialized in exposing corruption at the state and local levels. Lincoln Steffens went after corruption in big cities. Ida Tarbell attacked John D. Rockefeller's Standard Oil Company. Most of the muckrakers wrote nonfiction, but fictional exposes often had a major impact as well, such as those by Upton Sinclair. He is best known for exposing the corrupt meatpacking industry and the horrific working conditions of men working in these factories and the contamination in the meat.

== New Deal era ==
Most of the major newspapers in the larger cities were owned by conservative publishers and they turned hostile to liberal President Franklin D Roosevelt by 1934 or so, including major chains run by William Randolph Hearst. Roosevelt turned to radio, where he could reach more listeners more directly. During previous election campaigns, the parties sponsored nationwide broadcasts of major speeches. Roosevelt, however, gave intimate talks, person-to-person, as if he were in the same room sitting next to the fireplace. His rhetorical technique was extraordinarily effective. However, it proved very hard to duplicate. Young Ronald Reagan, beginning a career in as a radio broadcaster and Hollywood star, was one of the few to match the right tone, nuance, and intimacy that Roosevelt had introduced.

In peacetime, Freedom of the press was not an issue for newspapers. However, radio presented the new issue, for the government control the airwaves and licensed them. The Federal Communications Commission ruled in the "Mayflower decision" in 1941 against the broadcasting of any editorial opinion, although political parties could still purchase airtime for their own speeches and programs. This policy was replaced in 1949 by the "Fairness Doctrine" which allowed editorials, if opposing views were given equal time.

== Television era: 1950–1980s ==
Television arrived in the American home in the 1950s, and immediately became the main campaign medium. Party loyalties had weakened and there was a rapid growth in the number of independents. As a result, candidates paid less attention to rallying diehard supporters and instead appealed to independent-minded voters. They adopted television advertising techniques as their primary campaign device. At first the parties paid for long-winded half-hour or hour long speeches. By the 1960s, they discovered that the 30-second or one-minute commercial, repeated over and over again, was the most effective technique. It was expensive, however, so fund-raising became more and more important in winning campaigns.

== New media era: since 1990 ==
US Newspaper Advertising Revenue Newspaper Association of America published data

Major technological innovations transformed the mass media. Radio, already overwhelmed by television, transformed itself into a niche service. It developed an important political dimension based on talk radio. Television survived with a much reduced audience, but remained the number one advertising medium for election campaigns. Newspapers were in desperate trouble; most afternoon papers closed, and most morning papers barely survived, as the Internet undermined both their advertising and their news reporting.

The new social media, such as Facebook and Twitter, made use first of the personal computer and the Internet, and after 2010 of the smart phones to connect hundreds of millions of people, especially those under age 35. By 2008, politicians and interest groups were experimenting with systematic use of social media to spread their message among much larger audiences than they had previously reached.

As political strategists turn their attention to the 2016 presidential contest, they identify Facebook as an increasingly important advertising tool. Recent technical innovations have made possible more advanced divisions and subdivisions of the electorate. Most important, Facebook can now deliver video ads to small, highly targeted subsets. Television, by contrast, shows the same commercials to all viewers, and so cannot be precisely tailored. Online presence is vital to the success of a presidential candidate's campaign. Social media presence lets candidates: have direct access to voters, advertise for free, and fundraise, among other benefits.

It is also important to look at women in American politics and how they are portrayed in the media, as they are largely under represented in the news. "For example, Rakow and Kranich (1991), in their study of three network news programs, found that women were used as on camera sources only 15% of the time". This highlights how women are extremely under represented not only in American Politics but also within the media.

In addition to media sources, TikTok has become more prevalent as of 2024. There are many politicians that have started using TikTok as a platform to get attention from younger voters. Even the Democratic and Republican parties have their own accounts that they use to campaign. Additionally, TikTok facilitated a false-registration drive for a Trump rally, amplified police brutality footage, and shared Black Lives Matter protests, showcasing its distinctive audiovisual vernacular, often disorienting and carefully edited. Researchers have analyzed political expression on TikTok since its inception, revealing a diverse, diffuse, and not nearly united community of millions of young people discovering the platform's capabilities and limits, despite its unique and strange nature.

TikTok has become an increasingly common source of news for Americans: 20% report using it for news. In 2026, to comply with the Foreign Adversary Controlled Applications Act, TikTok's majority shareholder ByteDance reduced its holdings and the company's ownership was split between Oracle, Silver Lake, and Abu Dhabi's investment fund. Reports in early 2026 indicate TikTok CEO Adam Presser is in coordination with the White House to censor content contrasting with the current administration's goals, including a blanket ban on the word "Epstein" in relation to the Epstein files. Adam Presser during a 2025 World Jewish Congress Plenary Assembly updated Tiktok's moderation policy around the use of the word Zionist. He claimed that the term was acceptable if it was used to refer to a political ideology. It was prohibited to be used as a slur in relation to the Israel Palestine conflict.

The use of censorship on social media was widely debated in the mid 2010s in relation to specific cases, such as the removal or flagging of misinformation and hate speech on Facebook and the removal of a New York Post story on President Biden's son, Hunter Biden, who allegedly had the contents of his laptop leaked to the magazine from Twitter. Americans continue to engage with social media as a source of news despite increasing collusion between technology firms and the Trump administration.

Podcasts as a source of news and long form discussion content has become increasingly popular for Americans. A number of high profile podcasts continue to serve as important benchmarks for the temperature or leanings of American political ideology, particularly Joe Rogan in the lead up to the 2020 and 2024 elections, as well as a growing number of podcasts across the political divide.

== Contemporary media ==
As a few new technologies were becoming easily available, experts did not expect the internet to have a major impact in American politics, before the year 2000. During this time mass media outlets such as newspapers, radios, and networks were losing public in alarming numbers. The focus in the newsroom for mass media outlets shifted from policy to character, when addressing American political news. This change only aggravated the opinion of the American public, on the way mass media handled political news. During this time political candidates would use paid political advertising, rich in content, in order to better inform about their policies to the public.

While the introduction of the internet and digital media gave some hope of changing the way mass media portrayed political news, this did not happen. Immediacy, “the quality of bringing one into direct and instant involvement with something, giving rise to a sense of urgency or excitement,” continued to be the focus of mass media, as represented by major networks like CNN, Fox News and MSNBC. They, have maintained their audiences based on the success of providing entertaining programming, focusing on dramatic content. The entertaining and engaging political news, some mass media outlets introduced, procured the rise of soft news.

As indicated by Newman and Smith, in their essay titled “Fanning the Flames, Religious Media Consumption and American Politics,” in 2007, soft news can have considerable political influence. Britannica defines “soft news” as, “Soft news also called market-centered journalism, journalistic style and genre that blurs the line between information and entertainment. …” Furthermore, as pointed out by Baum, in 2005 consumers of soft news are being exposed to relevant political suggestions as a collateral to turning their attention to soft news.

The media's agenda-setting power can shape the issues that receive attention from the public and policymakers. Media coverage can impact public opinion and policy preferences. Political parties can also influence the media agenda formation. The media's influence on politics is not always consistent and can vary depending on the context. Scholars have also examined the loss of parliamentary control due to mediatization and internationalization. Overall, the relationship between mass media and American politics is complex and multifaceted, with the media playing a significant role in shaping political agendas and influencing public opinion, but its influence is also contingent and can be influenced by other factors.

== See also ==
- American election campaigns in the 19th century
- History of American newspapers
- Mass media
- Political journalism
- Social media and political communication in the United States
- Talk radio
- List of United States political catchphrases, slogans and rhetoric
