= Julia Carrie Wong =

American journalist

- Education: Harvard University; University of Iowa
- Occupation: journalist
- Employer: The Guardian

Julia Carrie Wong is a journalist primarily reporting on labor, tech and extremism, currently for The Guardian. Her reporting on Facebook and its involvement in disinformation and misinformation campaigns that artificially promoted candidates in Azerbaijan and Honduras has raised awareness of Facebook's content management controversies, as has her reporting on the company's similar failure to act on white supremacist groups on Facebook.

She began her journalism career as a freelance reporter. In the past, she has reported for The New Yorker and SF Weekly, as well as The Nation and In These Times.

== Early life and education ==
Wong received a Bachelor of Arts degree in English from Harvard University and an M.F.A. from the University of Iowa.

== Career ==
Wong began her journalism career in 2014 as a freelance reporter, covering social justice-related topics in the Bay Area for publications including politically progressive outlets In These Times, Salon.com and The Nation, as well as BuzzFeed, The New Yorker and Vice Media.

After freelance reporting, Wong became a staff writer for San Francisco's alt-weekly, SF Weekly, before joining the Guardian's staff in 2016, where she is now a technology reporter. In her reporting, Wong has broken down the relationships between race and meme culture, the prevalence of right-wing terrorism and extremism online, as well as misogyny and transphobia, particularly on Facebook, highlighting dynamics online, as well as the connections between labor issues and the tech industry, like the gentrification of San Francisco. Additionally, Wong has reported on debates over critical race theory and diversity and inclusion.

In 2019, Wong reported on the specific issue of white supremacist groups on Facebook, undertaking a review of white nationalist pages and organizations active on the social media site, highlighting the company's failure to act on hate speech. Following the publication of her story, Wong became the target of a notable online harassment campaign.
