= Facebook content management controversies =

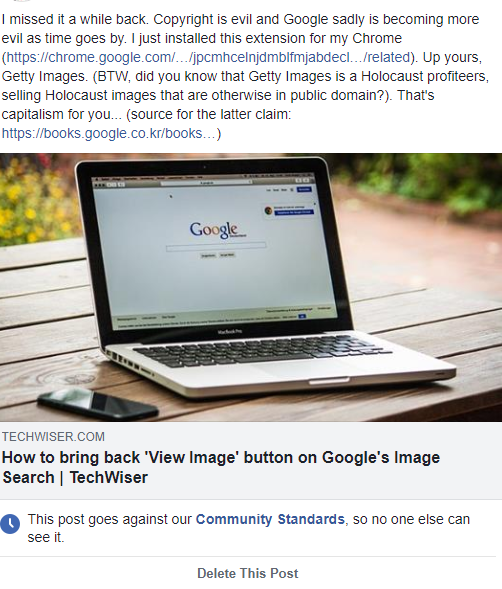
An example of a Facebook post censored due to an unspecified conflict with "Community Standards"

Error message generated by Facebook for an attempt to share a link to a website that is censored due to Community Standards in a private chat. Messages containing certain links will not be delivered to the recipient.

Facebook and Meta Platforms have been criticized for their management of various content on posts, photos and entire groups and profiles. This includes but is not limited to allowing violent content, including content related to war crimes, and not limiting the spread of fake news and COVID-19 misinformation on their platform, as well as allowing incitement of violence against multiple groups.

== Intellectual property infringement ==
Facebook has been criticized for having lax enforcement of third-party copyrights for videos uploaded to the service. In 2015, some Facebook pages were accused of plagiarizing videos from YouTube users and re-posting them as their own content using Facebook's video platform, and in some cases, achieving higher levels of engagement and views than the original YouTube posts. Videos hosted by Facebook are given a higher priority and prominence within the platform and its user experience (including direct embedding within the News Feed and pages), giving a disadvantage to posting it as a link to the original external source. In August 2015, Facebook announced a video-matching technology aiming to identify reposted videos, and also stated its intention to improve its procedures to remove infringing content faster. In April 2016, Facebook implemented a feature known as "Rights Manager", which allows rights holders to manage and restrict the upload of their content onto the service by third-parties.

== Violent content ==
In 2013, Facebook was criticized for allowing users to upload and share videos depicting violent content, including clips of people being decapitated. Having previously refused to delete such clips under the guideline that users have the right to depict the "world in which we live", Facebook changed its stance in May, announcing that it would remove reported videos while evaluating its policy. The following October, Facebook stated that it would allow graphic videos on the platform, as long as the intention of the video was to "condemn, not glorify, the acts depicted", further stating that "Sometimes, those experiences and issues involve graphic content that is of public interest or concern, such as human rights abuses, acts of terrorism, and other violence. When people share this type of graphic content, it is often to condemn it. If it is being shared for sadistic pleasure or to celebrate violence, Facebook removes it." However, Facebook once again received criticism, with the Family Online Safety Institute saying that such videos "crossed a line" and can potentially cause psychological damage among young Facebook users, and then-Prime Minister of the United Kingdom David Cameron calling the decision "irresponsible", citing the same concerns regarding young users. Two days later, Facebook removed a video of a beheading following "worldwide outrage", and while acknowledging its commitment to allowing people to upload gory material for the purpose of condemnation, it also stated that it would be further strengthening its enforcement to prevent glorification. The company's policies were also criticized as part of these developments, with some drawing particular attention to Facebook's permission of graphic content but potential removal of breastfeeding images. In January 2015, Facebook announced that new warnings would be displayed on graphic content, requiring users to explicitly confirm that they wish to see the material.

== War crimes ==
Facebook has been criticized for failing to take down violent content depicting war crimes in Libya. A 2019 investigation by the BBC found evidence of alleged war crimes in Libya being widely shared on Facebook and YouTube. The BBC found images and videos on social media of the bodies of fighters and civilians being desecrated by fighters from the self-styled Libyan National Army. The force, led by General Khalifa Haftar, controls a swathe of territory in the east of Libya and is trying to seize the capital, Tripoli. BBC Arabic found almost one hundred images and videos from Libya shared on Facebook and YouTube, in violation of their companies' guidelines. The UK Foreign Office said it took the allegations extremely seriously and is concerned about the impact the recent violence is having on the civilian population.

In 2017, a Facebook video of Libyan National Army (LNA) special forces commander Mahmoud al-Werfalli was uploaded showing him shooting dead three captured fighters. The video was then shared on YouTube over ten thousand times. The International Criminal Court used it as evidence to indict al-Werfalli for the war crime of murder. The BBC found the original video was still on Facebook two years after his indictment and also discovered videos showing the bodies of civilians being desecrated. These were taken in Ganfouda, a district of Benghazi which was under siege by the LNA between 2016 and 2017. More than 300 people, including dozens of children died during the siege. A video uncovered by BBC Arabic showed soldiers mocking a pile of corpses of dead civilians and trampling on bodies. Among them was a 77-year-old woman, Alia Hamza. Her son, Ali Hamza, had five family members killed in Ganfouda.

Ali Hamza told BBC Arabic, "I sent links to lawyers to send to the ICC in the Hague against Khalifa Haftar and his military commanders regarding the massacres of civilians", said Hamza. In the video, the LNA soldiers label the civilians as terrorists. Human rights lawyer and war crimes specialist Rodney Dixon QC reviewed the evidence BBC Arabic found. "If groups are using those platforms to propagate their campaigns then those platforms should seriously look at their role because they could then be assisting in that process of further crimes being committed", he said. After presenting our findings to Facebook they removed all the videos that show a suspected war crime taking place. However, they opted not to suspend any of the accounts which we found linked to the images. Erin Saltman, Facebook's policy manager for counterterrorism in Europe, Middle East and Africa, told BBC Arabic, "Sometimes there are very conflicting narratives of whether or not the victim is a terrorist, or whether it's a civilian over who's committing that act, we cannot be the pure arbiters of truth." But Facebook and YouTube's own community guidelines explicitly prohibit content that promotes or depicts acts of violence.

=== Facebook Live ===
Facebook Live, introduced in August 2015 for celebrities and gradually rolled out for regular users starting in January 2016, lets users broadcast live videos, with Facebook's intention for the feature to be presenting public events or private celebrations. However, the feature has been used to record multiple crimes, deaths, and violent incidents, causing significant media attention.

Facebook has received criticism for not removing videos faster, and Facebook Live has been described as a "monster [Facebook] cannot tame" and "a gruesome crime scene for murders". In response, CEO Mark Zuckerberg announced in May 2017 that the company would hire 3,000 moderators to review content and invest in tools to remove videos faster.

== Pro-anorexia groups ==
In 2008, Facebook was criticized for hosting groups dedicated to promoting anorexia. The groups promoted dramatic weight loss programs, shared extreme diet tips, and posted pictures of emaciated girls under "Thinspiration" headlines. Members reported having switched to Facebook from Myspace, another social networking service, due to a perceived higher level of safety and intimacy at Facebook. In a statement to BBC News, a Facebook spokesperson stated that "Many Facebook groups relate to controversial topics; this alone is not a reason to disable a group. In cases where content is reported and found to violate the site's terms of use, Facebook will remove it."

== Pro-mafia groups' case ==
In Italy in 2009, the discovery of pro-mafia groups, one of them claiming Bernardo Provenzano's sainthood, caused an alert in the country and brought the government to rapidly issue a law that would force Internet service providers to deny access to entire websites in case of refused removal of illegal contents. The amendment was passed by the Italian Senate and now needs to be passed unchanged by the Chamber of Deputies to become effective.

Facebook criticized the government's efforts, telling Bloomberg that it "would be like closing an entire railway network just because of offensive graffiti at one station", and that "Facebook would always remove any content promoting violence and already had a takedown procedure in place."

== Trolling ==
On March 31, 2010, The Today Show ran a segment detailing the deaths of three separate adolescent girls and trolls' subsequent reactions to their deaths. Shortly after the suicide of high school student Alexis Pilkington, anonymous posters began trolling for reactions across various message boards, referring to Pilkington as a "suicidal CUSS", and posting graphic images on her Facebook memorial page. The segment also included an exposé of a 2006 accident, in which an eighteen-year-old student out for a drive fatally crashed her father's car into a highway pylon; trolls emailed her grieving family the leaked pictures of her mutilated corpse.

There have been cases where Facebook "trolls" were jailed for their communications on Facebook, particularly memorial pages. In Autumn 2010, Colm Coss of Ardwick, Britain, was sentenced to 26 weeks in jail under s127 of the Communications Act 2003 of Great Britain, for "malicious communications" for leaving messages deemed obscene and hurtful on Facebook memorial pages.

In April 2011, Bradley Paul Hampson was sentenced to three years in jail after pleading guilty to two counts of using a carriage service (the Internet) to cause offense, for posts on Facebook memorial pages, and one count each of distributing and possessing child pornography when he posted images on the memorial pages of the deceased with phalluses superimposed alongside phrases such as "Woot I'm dead".

== Rape pages ==
A series of pro-rape and "rape joke" content on Facebook drew attention from the media and women's groups. Rape Is No Joke (RINJ), a group opposing the pages, argued that removing "pro-rape" pages from Facebook and other social media was not a violation of free speech in the context of Article 19 of the Universal Declaration of Human Rights and the concepts recognized in international human rights law in the International Covenant on Civil and Political Rights. RINJ repeatedly challenged Facebook to remove the rape pages. RINJ then turned to advertisers on Facebook telling them not to let their advertising be posted on Facebook's 'rape pages'.

Following a campaign that involved the participation of Women, Action and the Media, the Everyday Sexism Project and the activist Soraya Chemaly, who were among 100 advocacy groups, Facebook agreed to update its policy on hate speech. The campaign highlighted content that promoted domestic and sexual violence against women, and used over 57,000 tweets and more than 4,900 emails to create outcomes such as the withdrawal of advertising from Facebook by 15 companies, including Nissan UK, House of Burlesque and Nationwide UK. The social media website initially responded by stating that "While it may be vulgar and offensive, distasteful content on its own does not violate our policies", but then agreed to take action on May 29, 2013, after it had "become clear that our systems to identify and remove hate speech have failed to work as effectively as we would like, particularly around issues of gender-based hate".

== Child abuse images ==
In June 2015, the UK National Society for the Prevention of Cruelty to Children raised concerns about Facebook's apparent refusal when asked to remove controversial video material which allegedly showed a baby in emotional distress.

In March 2017, BBC News reported in an investigation that Facebook only removed 18 of the 100 groups and posts it had reported for containing child exploitation images. The BBC had been granted an interview with Facebook policy director Simon Milner under the condition that they provide evidence of the activity. However, when presented with the images, Facebook canceled the interview, and told the BBC that it had been reported to the National Crime Agency for illegally distributing child exploitation images (the NCA could not confirm whether the BBC was actually being investigated). Milner later stated to the BBC that the investigation had exposed flaws in its image moderation process that have since been addressed, and that all of the reported content was removed from the service.

According to data from the National Center for Missing & Exploited Children in 2020, there have been 20 million reported incidents of child sexual abuse material on Facebook. This accounted for 95% of total incidents recorded by the organization, while Google accounted for half a million incidents, Snapchat for 150,000 and Twitter for 65,000.

== Objectification of women ==
In July 2017, GMA News reported that "a number" of secret Facebook groups that had been engaging in illegal activity of sharing "obscene" photos of women had been exposed, with the Philippine National Bureau of Investigation warning group members of the possibility of being liable for violating child pornography and anti-voyeurism laws. Facebook stated that it would remove the groups as violations of its community guidelines. A few days later, GMA News had an interview with one of the female victims targeted by one of the groups, who stated that she received friend requests from strangers and inappropriate messages. After reporting to authorities, the Philippine National Police's anti-cybercrime unit promised to take action in finding the accounts responsible. Senator Risa Hontiveros responded to the incidents with the proposal of a law that would impose "stiff penalties" on such group members, stating that "These people have no right to enjoy our internet freedom only to abuse our women and children. We will not allow them to shame our young women, suppress their right to express themselves through social media and contribute to a culture of misogyny and hate".

== Violation of Palestinian human rights ==
According to the study commissioned by Meta and carried out by Business for Social Responsibility (BSR), Facebook and Instagram's policies during Israeli attacks on the Gaza Strip in 2021 harmed the fundamental human rights of Palestinians. The social media giant had denied Palestinian users their freedom of expression by erroneously removing their content. BSR's report is yet another indictment of the company's ability to police its global public square and to balance freedom of expression against the potential for harm in a tense international context.

== Antisemitism ==
ProPublica investigated that advertisers were able to target ads at Facebook users who were interested in the categories "how to burn Jew" and "Jew hater". Facebook removed the categories and said it would try to stop them from appearing to potential advertisers.

In March 2019, Facebook subsidiary Instagram declined to remove an antisemitic image posted by right-wing conspiracy theorist Alex Jones, saying that it did not violate their community standards.

== Incitement of violence against Israelis ==
Facebook has been accused of being a public platform that is used to incite violence. In October 2015, 20,000 Israelis claimed that Facebook was ignoring Palestinian incitement on its platform and filed a class-action suit demanding that Facebook remove all posts "containing incitement to murder Jews".

Israeli politicians have complained that Facebook does not comply or assist with requests from the police for tracking and reporting individuals when they share their intent to kill or commit any other act of violence on their Facebook pages. In June 2016, following the murder of Hallel Ariel, 13, by a terrorist who posted on Facebook, Israeli Minister of Public Security Gilad Erdan charged that "Facebook, which has brought a positive revolution to the world, has become a monster ... The dialogue, the incitement, the lies of the young Palestinian generation are happening on the Facebook platform." Erdan accused Facebook of "sabotaging the work of Israeli police" and "refusing to cooperate" when Israel police turns to the site for assistance. It also "sets a very high bar" for removing inciting content.

In July 2016, a civil action for $1 billion in damages was filed in the United States District Court for the Southern District of New York on behalf of the victims and family members of four Israeli-Americans and one US citizen killed by Hamas militants since June 2014. The victims and plaintiffs in the case are the families of Yaakov Naftali Fraenkel, a 16-year-old who was kidnapped and murdered by Hamas operatives in 2014; Taylor Force, a 29-year-old American MBA student and US Army veteran killed in a stabbing spree in Jaffa in 2016; Chaya Braun, a three-month-old thrown from her stroller and slammed into the pavement when a Hamas attacker drove his car into a light rail station in Jerusalem in an October 2014; 76-year-old Richard Lakin who was killed in the October 2015 shooting and stabbing attack on a Jerusalem bus; and Menachem Mendel Rivkin, who was seriously wounded in a January 2016 stabbing attack in Jerusalem. The plaintiffs claimed that Facebook knowingly provided its social media platform and communication services to Hamas in violation of provisions of US Anti-Terrorism laws which prohibits US businesses from providing any material support, including services, to designated terrorist groups and their leaders. The government of the United States has designated Hamas as a "Foreign Terrorist Organization" as defined by US law. The suit claims that Hamas "used and relied on Facebook's online social network platform and communications services to facilitate and carry out its terrorist activity, including the terrorist attacks in which Hamas murdered and injured the victims and their families in this case". The legal claim was rejected; the court found that Facebook and other social media companies are not considered to be the publishers of material users post when digital tools used by the company match content with what the tool identifies as interested consumers.

In August 2016, Israel's security service, the Shin Bet, reported that it had arrested nine Palestinians who had been recruited by the Lebanon-based Hezbollah terrorist organization. Operatives of Hezbollah in Lebanon and Gaza Strip recruited residents of the West Bank, Gaza and Israel through Facebook and other social media sites. After recruiting cell leaders on Facebook, Hezbollah and the recruits used encrypted communications to avoid detection, and the leaders continued to recruit other members. The terror cells received Hezbollah funding and planned to conduct suicide bombings and ambushes and had begun preparing explosive devices for attacks, said the security service, which claimed credit for preventing the attacks. The Shin Bet said it also detected multiple attempts by Hezbollah to recruit Israeli Arabs through a Facebook profile.

On October 16, 2023, singer and internet personality Dalal Abu Amneh was arrested by the Israeli Police for allegedly promoting hate speech and inciting violence on social media following a massacre perpetrated by Hamas on October 7, 2023.

In 2016, legislation was being prepared in Israel, allowing fines of 300,000 shekels for Facebook and other social media like Twitter and YouTube for every post inciting or praising terrorism that is not removed within 48 hours, and could possibly lead to further acts of terrorism.

=== Countermeasure efforts ===
In June 2017, Facebook published a blog post, offering insights into how it detects and combats terrorism content. The company claimed that the majority of the terrorism accounts that are found are discovered by Facebook itself, while it reviews reports of terrorism content "urgently", and, in cases of imminent harm, "promptly inform authorities". It also develops new tools to aid in its efforts, including the use of artificial intelligence to match terrorist images and videos, detecting when content is shared across related accounts, and developing technologies to stop repeat offenders. The company stated that it has 150 people dedicated to terrorism countermeasures, and works with governments and industries in an effort to curb terrorist propaganda. Its blog post stated that "We want Facebook to be a hostile place for terrorists."

=== Employee data leak ===
In June 2017, The Guardian reported that a software bug had exposed the personal details of 1,000 Facebook workers involved in reviewing and removing terrorism content, by displaying their profiles in the "Activity" logs of Facebook groups related to terrorism efforts. In Facebook's Dublin, Ireland headquarters, six individuals were determined to be "high priority" victims of the error, after the company concluded that their profiles were likely viewed by potential terrorists in groups such as ISIS, Hezbollah and the Kurdistan Workers' Party. The bug itself, discovered in November 2016 and fixed two weeks later, was active for one month, and had also been retroactively exposing censored personal accounts from August 2016. One affected worker had fled Ireland, gone into hiding, and only returned to Ireland after five months due to a lack of money. Suffering from psychological distress, he filed a legal claim against Facebook and CPL Resources, an outsourcing company, seeking compensation. A Facebook spokesperson stated that "Our investigation found that only a small fraction of the names were likely viewed, and we never had evidence of any threat to the people impacted or their families as a result of this matter", and Craig D'Souza, Facebook's head of global investigations, said: "Keep in mind that when the person sees your name on the list, it was in their activity log, which contains a lot of information ... there is a good chance that they associate you with another admin of the group or a hacker". Facebook offered to install a home-alarm monitoring system, provide transport to and from work, and counseling through its employee assistance program. As a result of the data leak, Facebook is reportedly testing the use of alternative, administrative accounts for workers reviewing content, rather than requiring workers to sign in with their personal profiles.

== Fake news ==
Facebook has been criticized for not doing enough to limit the spread of fake news stories on their site, especially after the 2016 United States presidential election, which some have claimed Donald Trump would not have won if Facebook had not helped spread what they claim to have been fake stories that were biased in his favor. At a conference called Techonomy, Mark Zuckerberg stated in regards to Donald Trump, "There's a profound lack of empathy in asserting that the only reason why someone could have voted the way that they did is because they saw some fake news". Zuckerberg affirmed the idea that people do not stray from their own ideals and political leanings. He stated, "I don't know what to do about that" and, "When we started, the north star for us was: We're building a safe community".

Zuckerberg has also been quoted in his own Facebook post, "Of all the content on Facebook, more than 99 percent of what people see is authentic". In addition, The Pew Research Center, stated that "62% of Americans obtain some, or all, of their news on social media-the bulk of it from Facebook". The former editor at Facebook leaked inflammatory information about the websites' algorithm's pointing to certain falsehoods and bias by the news created within Facebook. Although Facebook initially denied claims of issues with fake new stories and their algorithms, they fired the entire trending team involved with a fake news story about Megyn Kelly being a "closeted liberal".

In 2016, Zuckerberg began to take steps to eliminate the prevalence of fake news on Facebook as a result of criticisms of Facebook's influence on the presidential election. Facebook initially partnered with ABC News, the Associated Press, FactCheck.org, Snopes and PolitiFact for its fact-checking initiative; as of 2018, it had over 40 fact-checking partners across the world, including The Weekly Standard. A May 2017 review by The Guardian found that Facebook's fact-checking initiatives of partnering with third-party fact-checkers and publicly flagging fake news were regularly ineffective, and appeared to be having minimal impact in some cases. In 2018, journalists working as fact-checkers for Facebook criticized the partnership, stating that it had produced minimal results and that the company had ignored their concerns.

== Incitement of violence in Sri Lanka ==
In March 2018, the government of Sri Lanka blocked Facebook and other social media services in an effort to quell the violence in the 2018 anti-Muslim riots, with Harsha de Silva, the Deputy Minister for National Policies and Economic Affairs, tweeting: "Hate speech on Facebook is increasing beyond acceptable levels. Government will have to act immediately to save lives." Sri Lankan telecommunications minister Harin Fernando stated that Facebook had been too slow in removing content and banning users who were using its platforms to facilitate violence during the riots. In response, Facebook stated that it had increased the number of Sinhalese speakers it employs to review content.

In April 2019, during the aftermath of the Easter bombings, the Sri Lankan government blocked access to Facebook, Instagram and WhatsApp in an effort to stop the spread of misinformation that could lead to further violence.

== Inclusion of Breitbart News as trusted news source ==
In October 2019, Facebook announced that Breitbart News, an American far-right news and opinion website, would be included as a "trusted source" in its Facebook News feature alongside sources like The New York Times and The Washington Post. The decision sparked controversy due to Breitbart News's status as a platform for the alt-right and its reputation for publishing misinformation. In October 2021, The Wall Street Journal reported that Facebook executives resisted removing Breitbart News from Facebook's News Tab feature to avoid angering Donald Trump and Republican members of Congress, despite criticism from Facebook employees. An August 2019 internal Facebook study had found that Breitbart News was the least trusted news source, and also ranked as low-quality, in the sources it looked at across the U.S. and Great Britain.

== Disinformation regarding Persecution of Uyghurs ==
In February 2021, a Press Gazette investigation found that Facebook had accepted promotional content from Chinese state media outlets such as China Daily and China Global Television Network that spread disinformation denying the persecution of Uyghurs in China.

== Incitement of human rights abuses in Myanmar ==
The chairman of the U.N. Independent International Fact-Finding Mission on Myanmar stated that Facebook played a "determining role" in the Rohingya genocide. Facebook has been accused of enabling the spread of Islamophobic content which targets the Rohingya people. The United Nations Human Rights Council has called the platform "a useful instrument for those seeking to spread hate".

The internet.org initiative was brought to Myanmar in 2015. Myanmar's relatively recent democratic transition did not provide the country with substantial time to form professional and reliable media outlets free from government intervention. Furthermore, approximately 1% of Myanmar's residents had internet access before internet.org. As a result, Facebook was the primary source of information and without verifiable professional media options, Facebook became a breeding ground for hate speech and disinformation. "Rumors circulating among family or friends' networks on Facebook were perceived as indistinguishable from verified news by its users." Frequent anti-Rohingya sentiments included high Muslim birthrates, increasing economic influence, and plans to take over the country. Myanmar's Facebook community was also nearly completely unmonitored by Facebook, who at the time only had two Burmese-speaking employees.

In response, Facebook removed accounts which were owned by the Myanmar Armed Forces because they had previously used Facebook to incite hatred against the Rohingya people, and they were currently "engaging in coordinated inauthentic behavior." In February 2021, Facebook banned the Myanmar military from its platform and set up rules to ban Tatmadaw-linked businesses.

The Myanmar military was not the only account found to have incited violence. In a review undertaken by Facebook in 2018, Facebook "banned accounts and pages associated with Myanmar military personnel that were indicated by the UN as being directly responsible for the ethnic cleansing in Rakhine. The banned accounts had a widespread reach in the country, as they were followed by nearly 12 million accounts, which is about half of all Myanmar's Facebook users."

On 6 December 2021, approximately a hundred Rohingya refugees launched a $150 billion lawsuit against Facebook, alleging that it did not do enough to prevent the proliferation of anti-Rohingya hate speech because it was interested in prioritizing engagement. On 10 December 2021, sixteen Rohingya youth living in Cox's Bazar refugee camp made a complaint against Facebook to the Irish National Contact Point for the OECD Guidelines for Multinational Enterprises, alleging that Facebook had violated the guidelines, and owed them a remedy. The lead complainants in the case included members of Rohingya civil society group Arakan Rohingya Society for Peace and Human Rights (ARSPH). Mohibullah, who founded ARSPH, and had spearheaded efforts amongst camp-based Rohingya refugees to hold Facebook accountable, had been murdered just over two months before.

On 27 December 2023, hundreds of students from various universities in Aceh, Indonesia, such as: Abulyatama University, Bina Bangsa Getsempena University, and University of Muhammadiyah Aceh, stormed a shelter for Rohingya refugees and forced them out of a convention centre in the city of Banda Aceh, demanding they be deported. The students were seen kicking the belongings of the Rohingya men, women, and children who were seated on the floor and crying in fear. They were also seen burning tyres and chanting various anti-Rohingya slogans. The protest was believed to be caused by Facebook due to anti-Rohingya sentiments that spread through the app.

On 23 January 2025, Rohingya human rights activist and genocide survivor Maung Sawyeddollah filed a whistleblower lawsuit against Meta before the U.S. Securities and Exchange Commission (SEC). The lawsuit accused Meta of having misled shareholders regarding its role in the Rohingya genocide in violation of U.S. securities law. The lawsuit was filed with the support of Amnesty International and the Open Society Foundations.

== Blue tick ==
Facebook grants blue ticks to verified accounts of public personalities, brands, and celebrities (including politicians and artists). They have no policy in the cases where an individual who has a verified blue tick account is convicted in a serious criminal case. A 2018 case in India occurred where a politician was convicted and sentenced to 10 years in jail in a serious bribery criminal case but his Facebook page still continued to be verified.

== Neo-Nazi and white supremacist content ==
From circa 2018 until March 27, 2019, Facebook's internal policy was to permit "white nationalist" content but not "white supremacist" content, despite advice stating there is no distinction. In practice, it hosted much white supremacist and neo-Nazi content. On March 27, 2019, Facebook backtracked and stated that white nationalism "cannot be meaningfully separated from white supremacy and organized hate groups".

In 2020 the Centre for Countering Digital Hate (CCDH) found Facebook was hosting a white supremacist network with more than 80,000 followers and links to the UK far-right. The CCDH said: "Facebook's leadership endangered public safety by letting neo-Nazis finance their activities through Facebook and Instagram ... Facebook was first told about this problem two years ago and failed to act."

== COVID-19 misinformation ==
In February 2020, the Taiwanese Central News Agency reported that large amounts of misinformation had appeared on Facebook claiming the pandemic in Taiwan was out of control, the Taiwanese government had covered up the total number of cases, and that President Tsai Ing-wen had been infected. The Taiwan fact-checking organization had suggested the misinformation on Facebook shared similarities with mainland China due to its use of simplified Chinese characters and mainland China vocabulary. The organization warned that the purpose of the misinformation is to attack the government. The Epoch Times, an anti-Chinese Communist Party (CCP) newspaper affiliated with Falun Gong, has spread misinformation related to the COVID-19 pandemic in print and via social media including Facebook and YouTube.

In April 2020, rumors circulated on Facebook, alleging that the US Government had "just discovered and arrested" Charles Lieber, chair of the Chemistry and Chemical Biology Department at Harvard University for "manufacturing and selling" the novel coronavirus (COVID-19) to China. According to a report from Reuters, posts spreading the rumor were shared in multiple languages over 79,000 times on Facebook.

In January 2021, the Bureau of Investigative Journalism found that 430 Facebook pages – being followed by 45 million people – were spreading false information about COVID-19 or vaccinations. This was despite a promise by Facebook in 2020 that no user or company should directly profit from false information about immunization against COVID-19. A Facebook spokesman said the company had "removed a small number of the pages shared with us for violating our policies". In August 2021, Facebook said that an article raising concerns about potentially fatal effects of a COVID-19 vaccine was the top-performing link in the United States between January and March 2021, and that another site publishing COVID-19 misinformation was among its top 20 visited pages.

== Marketplace illegal Amazon rainforest sales ==
In February 2021, BBC investigations revealed that Amazon rainforest plots on land reserved for indigenous people were being illegally traded on the Facebook Marketplace with the sellers admitting they do not have the land title. The BBC reported that Facebook were "ready to work with local authorities", but were unwilling to take independent action.

== Incitement of ethnic massacres in Ethiopia ==
In February 2022, Facebook was accused by the Bureau of Investigative Journalism and The Observer of letting activists incite ethnic massacres in the Tigray War by spreading hate and misinformation. Following the report, a lawsuit against Meta was filed in December 2022 in the High Court of Kenya by the son of a Tigrayan academic murdered in November 2021 after receiving racist attacks on the platform.

== 2025 policy changes ==
In January 2025, ahead of the second presidency of Donald Trump, Meta Platforms announced a number of policy changes across all divisions—some effective immediately— regarding moderation. Among the changes, Facebook will discontinue internal fact-checking in favor of a "Community Notes" system similar to X, in which contextual addendums may be added to posts with agreement from other users. In addition, Meta relaxed certain moderation practices to focus more on severe and illegal content; these include relaxations of certain "Hateful Content" policies to comply with "mainstream discourse", including allowing the targeting of others by "protected characteristics" in connection to the spread of COVID-19, allowing "allegations of mental illness or abnormality when based on gender or sexual orientation, given political and religious discourse about transgenderism and homosexuality and common non-serious usage of words like 'weird.'", and allowing discussions in support of "gender-based limitations of military, law enforcement, and teaching jobs". The company cited ongoing concerns that its services censor "too much harmless content", and a desire to "[provide] people with information about what they're seeing – and one that's less prone to bias". Meta also announced that it would re-locate its Trust & Safety division to Texas and other locations to reduce bias. Mark Zuckerberg stated that the changes were to ensure "more speech and fewer [moderation] mistakes".

The changes have faced criticism—especially from journalists and LGBT rights advocates—for opening LGBT users of Meta services such as Facebook to homophobic and transphobic prejudice, with comparisons drawn to the changes in content policies enacted by Elon Musk after his acquisition of Twitter (X). Human Rights Campaign (HRC) president Kelley Robinson stated that "while we understand the difficulties in enforcing content moderation, we have grave concerns that the changes announced by Meta will put the LGBTQ+ community in danger both online and off." 404 Media reported that the changes have led to major internal dissent among Meta employees. Concurrently, Meta also quietly removed transgender and non-binary flag themes from Messenger, previously added in June 2021 and 2022 respectively for Pride Month.

== See also ==
- Censorship by Facebook
- Criticism of Facebook
