= Censorship by Facebook =

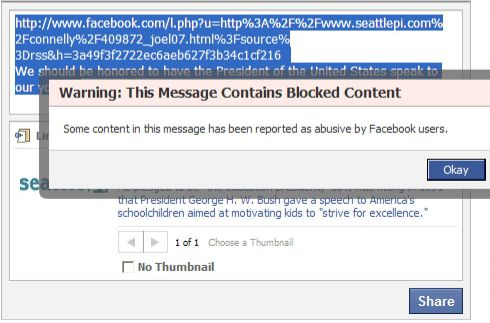
The warning box that appears when Internet users try to view censored or blocked content on Facebook (from 2009)

Facebook has been involved in multiple controversies involving censorship of content, removing or omitting information from its services in order to comply with company policies, legal demands, and government censorship laws.

== Anti-immigrant speech ==
In Germany, Facebook actively censors anti-immigrant speech, claiming they are reviewing posts more stringently and using legal opinions and language experts to determine whether users' comments are infringing on German law.

In May 2016, Facebook and other technology companies agreed to a new "code of conduct" by the European Commission to review hateful online content within 24 hours of being notified, and subsequently remove such content if necessary. A year later, Reuters reported that the European Union had approved proposals to make Facebook and other technology companies tackle hate speech content on their platforms, but that a final agreement in the European Parliament is needed to make the proposals into law. In June 2017, the European Commission praised Facebook's efforts in fighting hateful content, having reviewed "nearly 58 percent of flagged content within 24 hours".

== "Blasphemous" content ==
Facebook has worked with Pakistani government to censor "blasphemous" pages and speech inside Pakistan, censoring 54 posts in the second half of 2014.

== Online News Act and the Canadian wildfires ==
In response to the Online News Act, Meta (owner of Facebook) began blocking access to news sites for Canadian users at the beginning of August 2023. This also extended to local Canadian news stories about the wildfires, a decision that was heavily criticized by Trudeau, local government officials, academics, researchers, and evacuees. Trudeau accused Facebook of "putting corporate profits ahead of people’s safety," with Premier of British Columbia David Eby expressing similar sentiments.

Evacuees who fled the Northwest Territories wildfires described the difficulty they faced attempting to share news (made worse by an already "barren" media landscape in the territory), as many relied on Facebook to communicate their situation. Ollie Williams of Yellowknife's Cabin Radio said that users had to resort to posting screenshots of news stories, as posting news directly would result in the link getting blocked.

Meta responded to these criticisms by stating that Canadians "can continue to use our technologies to connect with their communities and access reputable information [...] from official government agencies, emergency services and non-governmental organizations," and encouraged them to use Facebook's Safety Check feature.

== Competing social networks ==
In October 2018, Facebook and Facebook Messenger was said to be blocking URLs to Minds, a social network website that is a competitor of Facebook. Users have complained that Facebook marks links to Facebook's competitor as "insecure" and have to fill a CAPTCHA to share it with other users. In 2015, Facebook was accused of banning rival network Tsu in a similar manner.

== Conservative news ==
In May 2016, Facebook was accused by a former employee of leaving out conservative topics from the trending bar. Although Facebook denied these allegations, the site planned to improve the trending bar.

In August 2018, Facebook deleted videos posted to it by PragerU. Facebook later reversed its decision and restored the PragerU content, saying that PragerU content was falsely reported to have hate speech.

As a result of perception that conservatives are not treated neutrally on Facebook, alternative social media platforms have been established. This perception has led to a reduction of trust in Facebook, and reduction of usage by those who consider themselves to be conservative.

In July 2020, Congressman Matt Gaetz filed a criminal referral against Facebook citing that evidence produced by Project Veritas demonstrated that Facebook CEO, Mark Zuckerberg, had made materially false statements to Congress while under oath in hearings which occurred in April 2018. Congressman Gaetz claimed that the evidence provided demonstrated that Zuckerberg's claims that the website did not engage in bias against conservative speech were false.

== COVID-19 vaccines ==
Facebook has been accused of censoring several posts related to COVID-19 vaccines. In October 2020, Facebook is said to have censored a claim the COVID-19 vaccines were imminent. On 2 November 2021, The BMJ published a piece by journalist Paul D. Thacker alleging there has been "poor practice" at Ventavia, one of the companies involved in the phase III evaluation trials of the Pfizer vaccine. The BMJ sent an open letter to Mark Zuckerberg explaining that "from November 10, readers began reporting a variety of problems when trying to share our article. Some reported being unable to share it. Many others reported having their posts flagged with a warning about "Missing context ... Independent fact-checkers say this information could mislead people." Those trying to post the article were informed by Facebook that people who repeatedly share "false information" might have their posts moved lower in Facebook's News Feed. Group administrators where the article was shared received messages from Facebook informing them that such posts were "partly false." Readers were directed to a "fact check" performed by a Facebook contractor named Lead Stories.".

== Criticism of Facebook ==
Newspapers regularly report stories of users who claim they've been censored on Facebook for being critical of Facebook itself, with their posts removed or made less visible. Examples include Elizabeth Warren in 2019 and Rotem Shtarkman in 2016.

Facebook has systems to monitor specific terms and keywords and trigger automatic or semi-automatic action. In the context of media reports and lawsuits from people formerly working on Facebook content moderation, a former Facebook moderator (Chris Gray) has claimed that specific rules existed to monitor and sometimes target posts about Facebook which are anti-Facebook or criticize Facebook for some action, for instance by matching the keywords "Facebook" or "DeleteFacebook".

== Criticism of the Israeli government ==
Facebook has been accused of censoring messages critical of Israel and supportive of Palestine. During conflict over the Sheikh Jarrah controversy in 2021, Facebook was accused of deleting hundreds of posts critical of Israel. Senior Facebook officials apologized to the Palestinian Prime Minister for censoring pro-Palestinian voices.

Al Jazeera Arabic presenter Tamer Almisshal has had his Facebook profile deleted by Meta 24 hours after the programme "Tip of the Iceberg" aired an investigation into Meta's censorship of Palestinian content titled The Locked Space. The programme's investigation, included admissions by Eric Barbing, former head of Israel's cybersecurity apparatus, about his organisation's effort to track Palestinian content according to criteria that included "liking" a photo of a Palestinian killed by Israeli forces.

Human Rights Watch released a report "Meta's Broken Promises: Systemic Censorship of Palestine Content on Instagram and Facebook," in December 2023, demonstrating patterns in suppressing protected speech and content in support of Palestinian nationalism. Also in December 2023, Elizabeth Warren wrote a letter to Meta requesting details on content moderation related to Gaza. Following a response, Warren was joined by Bernie Sanders in a follow-up letter asking for more comprehensive answers. A February 2024 Access Now report details the censorship of Palestinian reporters and advocates on Facebook, including removing documentation of human rights abuses.

In 2024, Meta restricted use of 🔻, the Down-Pointing Red Triangle emoji, with internal policy stating that the emoji was a proxy for support of Hamas.

== Criticism of the Chinese government ==
In response to the publication of Careless People and U.S. Senate testimony of Sarah Wynn-Williams, Taiwanese Democratic Progressive Party legislators called for further scrutiny of Facebook regarding allegations of its censorship of content critical of the Chinese government.

== Search function ==
Facebook's search function has been accused of preventing users from searching for certain terms. Michael Arrington of TechCrunch has written about Facebook's possible censorship of "Ron Paul" as a search term. MoveOn's Facebook group for organizing protests against privacy violations could for a time not be found by searching. The very word privacy was also restricted.

== Image censorship ==
Facebook has a policy of removing photos which they believe violate the terms and conditions of the website. Images have been removed from user pages on topics such as breastfeeding, nudity in art, apparent breasts (including round marzipan balls on an Easter simnel cake), naked mannequins, kisses between persons of the same sex and family photos.

Facebook made several statements that it would not censor nudity per se (without sexual activity) in paintings and sculptures (but not photography). In 2011, for instance, Facebook spokesperson Simon Axton declared: "We don't censor art and have no intention to." Nonetheless, it has often censored images of art posted on Facebook, including: Venus of Willendorf, c. 28,000–25,000 BC, Naturhistorisches Museum (Vienna); Giambologna's bronze statue of Neptune (1560s), the symbol of the city of Bologna; Caravaggio's painting Amor Vincit Omnia (Love conquers all,1602), Berlin, Gemäldegalerie, (2016); Edvard Eriksen's The Little Mermaid (1913), which is the most photographed artwork in Denmark. The most famous case is that of French educator Frédéric Durand, whose account was deleted "without warning" because he posted Gustave Courbet's painting The Origin of the World (1886). After seven years of deliberations, a French court ruled against Facebook, though it granted no damages to Durand. Art Historian Ruben C. Cordova's account was "permanently deleted" after he posted 16 images of John De Andrea's hyperrealist Self-Portrait with Sculpture (1980), featured in the Metropolitan Museum of Art's exhibition Like Life: Sculpture, Color, and the Body, though his account was ultimately restored.

In 2019, Facebook invited twenty artists and curators to discuss a "reconsideration" of Facebook and Instagram guidelines, but three years later, artists think nothing has improved. Moreover, instead of "Nudity" violations, some artist have received "Adult Sexual Solicitation" notices, which means "that artists are now not only trying to defend their subject matter, but the premise of their practice."

Out of frustration with censorship on social media, several museums in Vienna united to open an account on OnlyFans, which is dedicated to adult content. According to the Vienna Tourist Board: "Vienna and its art institutions are among the casualties of this new wave of prudishness—with nude statues and famous artworks blacklisted under social media guidelines, and repeat offenders even finding their accounts temporarily suspended... there are no clear guidelines on these platforms, nor rhyme or reason, in regards to what nudity is considered 'offensive' and what nudity is not."

In September 2016, Norwegian author Tom Egeland published Nick Ut's iconic napalm girl photo on his Facebook page as part of a list of iconic wartime photographs. He was banned for publishing "a picture of a nude child". A few weeks later, the newspaper Aftenposten published an open letter to Zuckerberg after the banning of "Napalm Girl", a Pulitzer Prize-winning documentary photograph from the Vietnam War made by Nick Ut. Half of the ministers in the Norwegian government shared the famous Nick Ut photo on their Facebook pages, among them prime minister Erna Solberg from the Conservative Party (Høyre). But after only a few hours, several of the Facebook posts, including the Prime Minister's post, were deleted by Facebook.

As a reaction to the letter, Facebook reconsidered its opinion on this picture and republished it, recognizing "the history and global importance of this image in documenting a particular moment in time".

=== Breastfeeding photos ===
Facebook has been repeatedly criticized for removing photos uploaded by mothers breastfeeding their babies. Although photos that show an exposed breast violate Facebook's decency code, photos were removed even when the baby covered the nipple.

The breastfeeding photo controversy continued following public protests and the growth in membership of a Facebook group titled "Hey, Facebook, breastfeeding is not obscene! (Official petition to Facebook)." In December 2011, Facebook removed photos of mothers breastfeeding and after public criticism, restored the photos. The company said it removed the photos they believed violated the pornographic rules in the company's terms and conditions. During February 2012, the company renewed its policy of removing photos of mothers breastfeeding. Founders of a Facebook group "Respect the Breast" reported that "women say they are tired of people lashing out at what is natural and what they believe is healthy for their children."

== Censorship of editorial content ==
On February 4, 2010, a number of Facebook groups against the Democratic Alliance for the Betterment and Progress of Hong Kong (DAB) were removed without any reason given. The DAB is one of the largest pro-Beijing political parties in Hong Kong. The affected groups have since been restored.

== Censorship on the Kashmir freedom movement ==
In 2016, Facebook banned and also removed content regarding the Kashmir dispute, triggering a response from The Guardian, BBC and other media groups on Facebook's policies on censorship. Facebook censorship policies have been criticized especially after the company banned the posts about the Indian army's attack on protesters, including children, with pellet guns. A human rights group superimposed pellet injuries similar to those inflicted on Kashmiris on the faces of popular Indian actors, famous people including Facebook founder Mark Zuckerberg and even Prime Minister Narendra Modi as a response, which went viral.

== Kurdish opposition censorship ==
Facebook has a policy to censor anything related to Kurdish opposition against Turkey, such as maps of Kurdistan, flags of Kurdish armed groups (such as PKK and YPG), and criticism of Mustafa Kemal Atatürk, the founder of Turkey.

== Censorship in line with US foreign policy ==
In October 2021, a secret blacklist of "dangerous individuals and organizations" maintained by Facebook was discovered by The Intercept, which revealed censorship in the MENA region was stricter than in the USA. Critics and scholars have argued the blacklist and the guideline stifle free discussion, as well as enforcing an uneven enforcement of the rules.

== See also ==
- Criticism of Facebook
- Censorship by Apple
- Censorship by Google
- Censorship by TikTok
- Censorship by Twitter
- Issues involving social networking services
