= Soraya Chemaly =

American author and activist (born 1966)

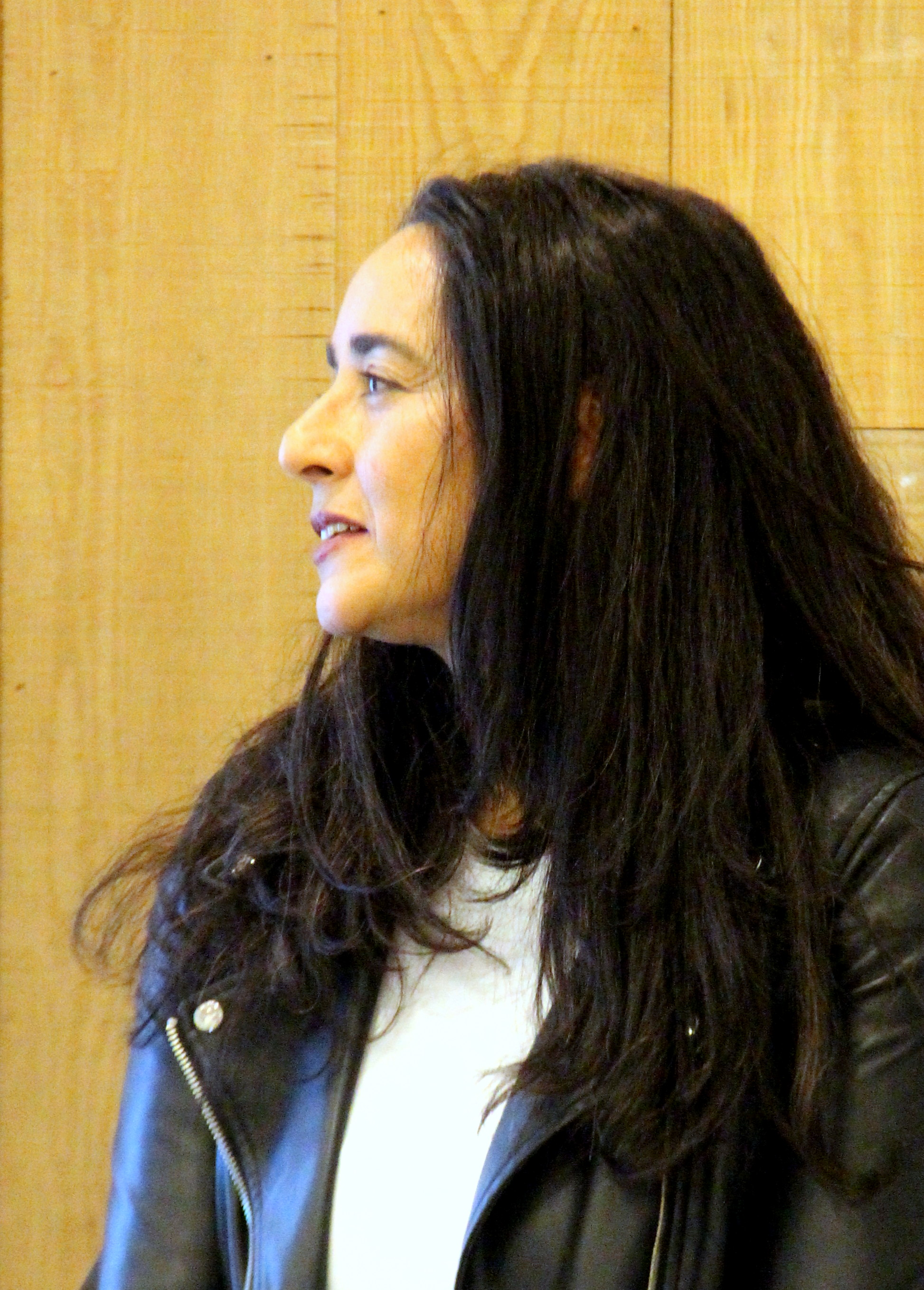
Chemaly in 2017

Soraya Lisa Catherine Chemaly (born 1966 in Florida) is a Bahamian-American author, activist and feminist. Her best-known book, Rage Becomes Her: The Power of Women's Anger (2018), has been translated into multiple languages.

== Early life and education ==
Soraya Chemaly was born in Florida in 1966. Her parents are Edward and Norma Chemaly of Nassau, Bahamas. She descends from Bahamians and Arab Christians who emigrated from Jordan and Lebanon to Haiti in the 1920s. She grew up a strict Catholic in the Bahamas, where her parents owned a chain of gift shops.

After graduating from Phillips Academy in Andover, Massachusetts, Chemaly began studying Catholic theology, history, and women's studies. As a student, she founded the feminist magazine The New Press. She graduated Magna cum laude from Georgetown University in 1988; she was elected a member of Phi Beta Kappa. In a 2015 interview, she said that by the time she left the university, she was a "feminist atheist".

== Career ==
Prior to 2010, Chemaly worked for over fifteen years as a marketing consultant and executive in the media and IT industries. Her employers included the Gannett media corporation, and the Claritas technology company, where she was promoted to senior vice president of Marketing Strategy.

Chemaly then changed careers to become an activist and freelance journalist, writing for The Atlantic, Time, The Guardian, HuffPost and Ms., among others. Her main areas of focus have been freedom of expression, gender, women's rights, sexualised violence, media and technology. She is also the director of the Women's Media Center Speech Project, an initiative "dedicated to expanding women's freedom of expression and curbing online harassment and abuse."

== Rage Becomes Her ==
Chemaly's first book Rage Becomes Her: The Power of Women's Anger was published in 2018 and reviewed (often in tandem with Rebecca Traister's 2018 book Good and Mad) in numerous publications such as The New York Times, The Washington Post, and The New Yorker. Seth Borenstein of NYU said of the book:

[It] delves into the constant tug of war women face between being underpaid and overworked, too sensitive or not sensitive enough, too dowdy or too made-up, and between many other extremes. Chemaly's work explores how women are pulled in all of these different directions and how rage is one of the most important resources women have. She argues rage is the sharpest tool against both personal and political oppression. Chemaly details how women have been told for so long to bottle up their anger, letting it corrode their bodies and minds in ways they don't even realize. Yet this anger is a vital instrument, a radar for injustice and a catalyst for change. On the flip side, the societal and cultural belittlement of women's anger is a cunning way of limiting and controlling a woman's power.

In 2019, the book was published in French, Italian, Spanish and Dutch. The German translation by Suhrkamp Verlag appeared in May 2020 under the title Speak Out! The Power of Female Rage. Susanne Billig wrote in Deutschlandfunk Kultur that Chemaly moves "back and forth between gripping reports of experiences and impressive research into psychological, sociological, biological and political science studies." Susan Vahabzadeh (Süddeutsche Zeitung) read the book as "alternately a flaming manifesto, a report of self-experience and a derivation from studies". Vahabzadeh added that most women probably agree with Chemaly "that anger is not welcome in women". In taz, Helen Roth praised the author for not leaving readers "alone with their anger, but offers practical recommendations for how to channel their anger in a constructive way. In doing so, the award-winning journalist puts an end to the myth of women as sudden and vengeful Xanthippes and develops an image of women that has the power to transform society into a freer and more open one."

== Awards ==
In 2013, Chemaly won the "Donna Allen Award" for feminist advocacy from the Association for Education in Journalism and Mass Communication (AEJMC), and was named "Secular Activist of the Year" by The Feminist Wire. In 2014, she was selected by Elle magazine as one of the 25 most inspiring women to follow on social media. In 2016, she received the Women and Media Award from the Women's Institute for Freedom of the Press (WIFP). The following year, Syracuse University's Newhouse School of Public Communications gave her a Mirror Award for excellence in industry reporting; she was specifically honored in the "Best Single Story" category for co-writing a 2016 investigative piece on free speech and moderation of online content. In 2019, she received the Feminist Power Award from the Feminist Press.

== Personal life ==
In 1992, Chemaly married Thomas Jones, a graduate of Georgetown Law School. They live in Washington, D.C., and have three children. Her mother-in-law, Patricia Bleecker Jones, formerly served as president general of the Colonial Dames of America in Manhattan.

While staying at home with her young children, Chemaly took up painting as a hobby and has since sold many of her works.

== Writings ==
=== Books ===
- Rage Becomes Her. The Power of Women's Anger, Atria Books, NYC, 2018, ISBN 978-1501189555.

- Speak out! Die Kraft weiblicher Wut, aus dem amerikanischen Englisch von Kirsten Riesselmann und Gesine Schröder, Suhrkamp Verlag, Berlin 2020, ISBN 978-3518469460.

- The Resilience Myth: New Thinking on Grit, Strength, and Growth after Trauma, Atria/One Signal Publishers, NYC, 2024, ISBN 1668079135.
- All We Want Is Everything: How We Dismantle Male Supremacy, Atria/One Signal Publishers, 2025, ISBN 978-1-6682-0597-6

=== Chapters and forewords ===
- "The Unapologetic No" (chapter) in Nathman, Avital Norman, ed. (2013). The Good Mother Myth: Redefining Motherhood to Fit Reality. Seal Press. ISBN 978-1580055024.
- "Slut-Shaming and the Sex Police: Social Media, Sex, and Free Speech" (chapter) in Tarrant, Shira, ed. (2015). Gender, Sex, and Politics: In the Streets and Between the Sheets in the 21st Century. Routledge. pp. 125–140. ISBN 978-0415737838.
- "Dress Codes or How Schools Skirt Around Sexism and Homophobia" (chapter) in Cappiello, Katie; McInerney, Meg (2015). SLUT. A Play and Guidebook for Combating Sexism and Sexual Violence. The Feminist Press at CUNY. pp. 229–236. ISBN 978-1558618701.
- "The Quietly Relentless" (chapter) in Nevertheless, We Persisted: 48 Voices of Defiance, Strength, and Courage. Knopf Books for Young Readers. 2018. ISBN 978-1524771966.
- Foreword to Ging, Debbie; Siapera, Eugenia, eds. (2019). Gender Hate Online: Understanding the New Anti-Feminism. Cham, Switzerland: Palgrave Macmillan. ISBN 978-3319962252.
- "Demographics, Design and Free Speech: How Demographics Have Produced Social Media Optimized for Abuse and the Silencing of Marginalized Voices" (chapter) in Brison, Susan J.; Gelber, Katharine, eds. (2019). Free Speech in the Digital Age. Oxford University Press. pp. 150–169. ISBN 978-0190883591.
- "Constructing the Future: The Believe Me Internet" (chapter) in Valenti, Jessica; Friedman, Jaclyn, eds. (2020). Believe Me: How Trusting Women Can Save the World. Seal Press. pp. 93–110. ISBN 978-1580058797.
- Foreword to Brown, Christia Spears (2021). Unraveling Bias: How Prejudice Has Shaped Children for Generations and Why It's Time to Break the Cycle. BenBella Books. ISBN 978-1953295552.
- "Society Makes a Choice Before Any of Us Can" (chapter) in Hines, Elizabeth G., ed. (2022). Aftermath: Life in Post-Roe America. She Writes Press. pp. 89–94. ISBN 978-1647426019.

=== Selected articles ===
- "The Everyday Sexism of Women Waiting in Public Toilet Lines". TIME. January 5, 2015.
- "What Should High Schools Do? 44 Percent of Sexual Assaults Happen Before College". HuffPost. April 27, 2015.
- "Reddit row: The symbiosis of online sexism and tech's gender gap". New Scientist. July 15, 2015.
- "Why we need to take street harassment seriously". The Washington Post. September 28, 2015.
- "Campus Protests Are Part of a Critique of White Male Privilege". TIME. November 17, 2015.
- "Washington Post Appointment Emblematic of Media Industry's Persistent Marginalization of Women". Women's Media Center. December 9, 2015.
- "The Secret Rules of the Internet: The murky history of moderation, and how it's shaping the future of free speech". The Verge. April 13, 2016. Co-written with Catherine Buni.
- "In Orlando, as Usual, Domestic Violence Was Ignored Red Flag". Rolling Stone. June 13, 2016.
- "What Men Should Understand About Sexist Microaggressions". DAME. November 28, 2018.
- "How women and minorities are claiming their right to rage". The Guardian. May 11, 2019.
- "Trump's Attacks on Congresswomen Are Racist and Sexist. Ignoring That Is a Mistake We Can't Afford". Glamour. July 18, 2019.
