= Jack Sweeney =

American programmer (born c.2002)

- Born: c. 2002 (age 23–24)
- Education: University of Central Florida
- Occupation: Programmer
- Years active: 2020–present
- Known for: Jet Tracking
- Awards: Forbes 30 Under 30 (2024)
- Website: jackstech.net

Jack Sweeney (born c. 2002) is an American programmer. In 2022, he became known for creating Twitter bots to track the private jets of Russian oligarchs and other prominent individuals, including Elon Musk through the ElonJet account, and Taylor Swift.

== Life ==
Sweeney's father, a Technical Operations Controller for American Airlines, introduced him to aviation when he was young. Sweeney would use flight-tracking data to track his father coming home when he commuted from Dallas back to Florida.

In the beginning of 2022, Sweeney was a freshman at the University of Central Florida, and was studying information technology. He intends to work in software engineering. In February 2022, Sweeney stated in an interview with Bloomberg Wealth that he was establishing a company called "Ground Control" that monitors flight activity of prominent billionaires.

=== Creation of flight monitoring tools ===
As a teenager, Sweeney developed Twitter bots to track and share the locations of the private jets of several individuals including Elon Musk, Jeff Bezos, Mark Zuckerberg, Bill Gates, Donald Trump, and Drake. His program uses public data sources including the Federal Aviation Administration, OpenSky Network, and Automatic Dependent Surveillance–Broadcast. In June 2020, he created the "Elon Musk's Jet" Twitter account, dedicated to tracking Musk's private jet by using bots that scrape publicly available air traffic data.

During the 2022 Russian invasion of Ukraine, Sweeney began tweeting the location of approximately 30 private jets belonging to Russian oligarchs. In a March 2022 interview with CBS MoneyWatch, Sweeney stated his desire to see their planes seized. Some oligarchs being tracked include Vladimir Putin, Len Blavatnik, Roman Abramovich, Alexander Abramov, Dmitry Rybolovlev, Arkady Rotenberg, Eugene Shvidler, Vladimir Potanin, Vagit Alekperov, Oleg Deripaska, Mikhail Prokhorov, Alisher Usmanov, Viktor Vekselberg, Leonid Mikhelson, Viktor Medvedchuk, Vladimir Lisin, Suleyman Kerimov, Oleg Tinkov, Yuri Linnik, Yevgeny Prigozhin, Dmitry Mazepin, and Alexei Mordashov.

In April 2022, Sweeney stopped tracking Mark Cuban's travel in exchange for his friendship and business advice.

In May 2023, Sweeney began tracking the flights of Florida Governor Ron DeSantis after DeSantis signed a bill into law redacting details of his trips he made as Governor.

=== Legal threats by public figures ===
==== Elon Musk ====
In November 2021, Musk cited security concerns and requested that Sweeney stop tracking his private Gulfstream jet in exchange for $5,000. Sweeney responded that he might stop tracking Musk's private jet in exchange for an internship, US$50,000, or a Tesla Model 3. In November 2022, after Musk bought Twitter, Musk said, "My commitment to free speech extends even to not banning the account following my plane, even though that is a direct personal safety risk". On December 14, 2022, Twitter suspended Sweeney's airplane-tracking accounts for Musk, Bill Gates, Jeff Bezos, Mark Zuckerberg and Russian oligarchs, as well as Sweeney's personal Twitter account. Sweeney reacted to the suspension, stating: "I mean, this looks horrible. He literally said he was keeping my account up for free speech". On December 15, a number of high-profile journalists were banned after covering Twitter's removal of the ElonJet account.

Musk announced that he would be taking legal action against Sweeney. In support of his intended legal action, Musk alleged that in Los Angeles, a car carrying his 2-year-old son was followed by a "crazy stalker" who thought Musk was inside, "blocked [the] car from moving" and "climbed onto [the] hood." A Los Angeles Police detective in the stalking investigations unit said they had no evidence indicating that the alleged stalker had used ElonJet. Regarding the incident, South Pasadena police said that they were investigating "an assault with a deadly weapon involving a vehicle", and labelled a member of Musk's security team as a "suspect".

Sweeney has posted publicly available information about Musk's flights and airports used, but Sweeney did not share information about Musk's cars or family members. Sweeney denied being involved in the alleged stalking incident, stating that the ElonJet account had no posts in the 24 hours prior to the incident, and that the location of the alleged stalking incident was far from any airport; Sweeney also told the media that he believed Musk's legal threat against him was a bluff.

==== Taylor Swift ====
In December 2023, lawyers for Taylor Swift sent a cease and desist letter to Sweeney regarding the tracking of her private jet. Swift's lawyers stated that Sweeney's tracking presents a safety concern for Swift; Sweeney commented that the data he posts is publicly available on the Federal Aviation Administration database of flight data. The @TaylorSwiftJets Instagram account, owned by Sweeney, had shared a post estimating the carbon footprint of Swift's travel tied to her Eras Tour, after which the account was suspended by the platform. Sweeney said that he received the letter after media outlets began scrutinizing Swift's carbon footprint.
