= ElonJet =

Social media account tracking Elon Musk's jet

- Original author: Jack Sweeney
- Developer: Ground Control (GRNDCTRL LLC)
- Website: grndcntrl.net/falconlanding/
- Repository: github.com/Jxck-S/plane-notify

Account as seen on Instagram, 2022

ElonJet is a service that uses social media accounts to track the real-time usage of Elon Musk's private airplane. The service, created and provided by Jack Sweeney using public data, has accounts on Facebook, Instagram, Telegram, Truth Social, Mastodon, Threads, Bluesky, and formerly on Twitter, where the Twitter account once had about 530,000 followers, before being suspended. Several of the social media accounts use the handle @elonjet.

The Twitter account, created in June 2020, had been targeted by Musk beginning in 2021. He offered to pay Sweeney $5,000; Sweeney countered requesting $50,000 or an internship in one of Musk's companies, and offered advice on restricting flight tracking data. Musk blocked Sweeney in January 2021. In late 2022, after Musk purchased Twitter, he announced he would not ban the ElonJet account. In December, a stalker followed Elon's two-year-old son while he was traveling in a car; the stalker thought Musk was in the car. After the incident, the account was restricted and then blocked along with Sweeney's personal and other flight tracking accounts, as part of the December 2022 Twitter account suspensions. Later, shortly after the incident, accounts of several journalists were reinstated.

On December 22, 2022, Sweeney started the new @ElonJetNextDay Twitter account, which continues to track the flights of Elon Musk's private jets, but publishes flight location information on a 24-hour delay in compliance with Twitter's new rules that "sharing publicly available location information after a reasonable time has elapsed, so that the individual is no longer at risk for physical harm" is not a violation.

In October 2024, Meta suspended the @elonmusksjet account on Instagram, and Threads accounts as well as the corresponding Facebook pages.

== Function ==
The ElonJet service uses publicly available flight data as well as an automated computer program, a Twitter bot, to report Elon Musk's flights. The service uses ADS-B data, publicly available records, to give general information about where and when Musk's private jet was taking off and landing, though it cannot indicate who is on board or where the passengers travel before or after the flight. The Twitter account in particular became a reliable way for Musk's investors, fans, and critics to determine his whereabouts, often between the Austin area where he lives, the San Francisco Bay area where Tesla's factory is, and Southern California, where SpaceX is headquartered.

As of July 2023, the ElonJet service is hosted on Twitter, Facebook, Telegram, Instagram, Threads, Mastodon, and Bluesky accounts. The Mastodon account was created on December 14, 2022, a day after the original Twitter account was suspended. Sweeney has earned a few thousand dollars with the accounts, via ad revenue, allowing him to upgrade his computer. A subreddit dedicated to the service, r/ElonJetTracker, gained over 40,000 members in the two days since it was created on December 14, becoming one of the fastest-growing subreddits on the website.

The site has been cited as an example of open-source intelligence (OSINT), in which publicly available data is aggregated and analysed to generate insights. Its approach has inspired projects such as the 2026 “Apocalypse Early Warning System”, which monitors the movements of private aircraft types associated with wealthy individuals in an effort to do things such as identify patterns linked to major world events.

== History ==
The ElonJet Twitter account was started in June 2020 by Florida student Jack Sweeney. At the time, he was a high school senior, with his education suspended during the COVID-19 pandemic lockdown. Sweeney considered himself a fan of Musk's work at SpaceX and Tesla, leading him to start the account.

Elon Musk has had issues with the account for a long time, and offered Jack Sweeney $5,000 to delete the account in 2021. Sweeney countered asking for $50,000, saying he would use the money for college and possibly to buy a Tesla Model 3. Their last exchange was in January 2022, when Musk said it wouldn't feel right to pay in order to shut the account down. Sweeney asked about the possibility of an internship at one of Musk's companies, and offered Musk advice, including about a federal privacy program to vary the ID his transponder beamed out, thus blocking flight tracking programs. Musk began using the program, though Sweeney remained able to track Musk's flights. Musk blocked Sweeney sometime after January 23.

Avatar of Elon Musk

Elon Musk
(@elonmusk)
tweeted:

My commitment to free speech extends even to not banning the account following my plane, even though that is a direct personal safety risk

November 6, 2022

Musk purchased Twitter in October 2022, and announced early in the next month that he would not ban the ElonJet account, as he is an advocate for free speech, despite a "direct personal safety risk". On December 10, Sweeney shared his discovery that the Twitter account had been shadow banned, where Twitter intentionally limits the account's reach within the site. Twitter's Trust and Safety Council vice president asked to place "heavy visibility filtering" on the account. The council was disbanded on December 12, and that day Sweeney reported that the account no longer seemed hidden in any way.

On the morning of December 14, the social media site suspended the ElonJet account. Later that day, it was briefly reinstated and accessible, along with new rules having been released by Twitter that outlined limitations on sharing real-time location information due to concerns about physical safety, indicating that slightly delayed information would be acceptable under the new policy. According to the Washington Post, Sweeney then asked Musk how long of a data feed delay was required to comply with new rules, but the ElonJet account was re-suspended by the evening of the same day. Sweeney's personal Twitter account was also blocked, along with all of his other accounts that tracked private flights of public figures and Russian oligarchs. On December 15, the Twitter account of rival social network Mastodon was also blocked, for tweeting about the situation. According to The Verge, "it appears Twitter counts a link to @ElonJet's Mastodon account as a violation" of their newest policy against linking to third-party URLs that provide real-time travel information. The accounts of multiple journalists who frequently cover the technology industry were also banned for reporting on the issue.

=== Elon Musk's proposal of legal action ===
On December 14, 2022, Musk announced he would be taking legal action against Sweeney. On the same evening, Musk alleged in a tweet that a "crazy stalker" had followed a car carrying his two-year-old son in Los Angeles, saying that the accused individual "blocked [the] car from moving" and "climbed onto [the] hood". While Sweeney has posted publicly available information about Musk's private jets, flights, and airports used, Sweeney has not shared information about Musk's family members or Musk's cars. A Los Angeles Police detective in the stalking investigations unit said the unit had no evidence indicating the alleged stalker had used ElonJet. Regarding the incident, South Pasadena police said they were investigating a report of "an assault with a deadly weapon involving a vehicle", and labelled a member of Musk's security team as a "suspect". The statement also mentioned that "At no time during the incident did the victim identify the suspect or indicate the altercation was anything more than coincidental".

Sweeney stated that despite Musk's intention to sue, he does not plan to stop monitoring Musk's airplane travel and will continue publishing the flight‑tracking information by using other social media platforms, including on his new Mastodon account. One day later, on December 15, Twitter suspended the accounts of ten journalists of national news organizations without warning, as part of what was referred to as the "Thursday Night Massacre", after they had posted links to the ElonJet account or similar jet trackers. Musk claimed reporters had doxxed him and his family, and alleged that, by covering the ElonJet story, they were linking to real-time flight information, which is "basically assassination coordinates" according to Musk.

=== Account suspensions by Meta ===
In October 2024, Meta suspended the @elonmusksjet account on Instagram, and Threads accounts as well as the corresponding Facebook pages, along with several other jet-tracking accounts managed by Sweeney, including @Trump_Jet, @DesantisJet, @celebrityjets, @kimkjet, @kyliejennerjet, @bezosjets, @zuckerbergjet, and @taylorswiftjets.

These accounts had operated on Meta platforms for years without incident, using publicly available flight data to track private jets. Sweeney initially launched these on Meta platforms after being suspended from X/Twitter. ElonJet was also added to Threads in July 2023 when Threads was released.

Meta did not warn Sweeney about rule violations or provide reasoning for the sudden enforcement, only stating that the accounts now violated their policies; he believed the accounts had been "blacked out with no options to interact or receive information". In a statement to TechCrunch, a Meta spokesperson attributed the removals to a "risk of physical harm to individuals". Fortune correspondent Kali Hays was directed to a 2021 decision by Meta's Oversight Board regarding the "sharing of private residential information"; Hays found that the referenced Oversight decision "makes no mention of flight path tracking" as a privacy violation and noted that the flight data is "publicly available and maintained by the U.S. Federal Aviation Administration".
