= Suspensions on X =

Account suspended on X

X, formerly Twitter, may suspend accounts, temporarily or permanently, from their social networking service. Suspensions of high-profile accounts often attract media attention, and X's use of suspensions has been controversial.

== Policy ==
Users who are suspended from the platform, based on alleged violations of X's terms of service, are usually not informed which of their posts were the cause. They are told only that their accounts will not be restored. In addition to community guideline policy decisions, the platform's DMCA-detection system and spam-detection system are sometimes manipulated or abused by groups of users attempting to force a user's suspension.

Some commentators, such as technology entrepreneur Declan McCullagh and law professor Glenn Reynolds, have criticized Twitter's suspension and ban policies as overreaches of power.

== History ==
Between 2014 and 2016, Twitter suspensions were frequently linked to ISIL-related accounts. A "Twitter suspension campaign" began in earnest in 2015, and on one day, 4 April 2015, 10,000 accounts were suspended. Twitter repeatedly shut down accounts that spread ISIL material, but new ones popped up quickly and were advertised with their old Twitter handle; Twitter in return blocked those in what was called an ongoing game of Whac-A-Mole. By August 2014, Twitter had suspended a dozen official ISIL accounts, and between September and December 2014 it suspended at least 1000 accounts promoting ISIL. Twitter said that between mid-2015 and February 2016 it had suspended 125,000 accounts associated with ISIL and related organizations, and by August 2016 had suspended some 360,000 accounts for being associated with terrorism (not all these were ISIL-related).

In January 2016, Twitter was sued by the widow of an American man killed in the 2015 Amman shooting attack, claiming that allowing ISIL to continually use the platform, including direct messages in particular, constituted the provision of material support to a terrorist organization. Twitter disputed the claim. The lawsuit was dismissed by the United States District Court for the Northern District of California, upholding the Section 230 safe harbor, which dictates that the operators of an interactive computer service are not liable for the content published by its users. The lawsuit was revised in August 2016, providing comparisons to other telecommunications devices.

Twitter suspended multiple parody accounts that satirized Russian politics in May 2016, sparking protests and raising questions about where the company stands on freedom of speech. Following public outcry, Twitter restored the accounts the next day without explaining why the accounts had been suspended. The same day, Twitter, along with Facebook, Google, and Microsoft, jointly agreed to a European Union code of conduct obligating them to review "[the] majority of valid notifications for removal of illegal hate speech" posted on their services within 24 hours. In August 2016, Twitter stated that it had banned 235,000 accounts over the past six months, bringing the overall number of suspended accounts to 360,000 accounts in the past year, for violating policies banning use of the platform to promote extremism.

On 10 May 2019, Twitter announced that they suspended 166,513 accounts for promoting terrorism in the July–December 2018 period, stating there was a steady decrease in terrorist groups trying to use the platform owing to its "zero-tolerance policy enforcement". According to Vijaya Gadde, Legal, Policy and Trust and Safety Lead at Twitter, there was a reduction of 19% terror-related tweets from the previous reporting period (January–June 2018).

In September 2017, Twitter responded to calls to suspend U.S. President Donald Trump's account, clarifying that they will not do so as they consider his tweets to be "newsworthy".

In October 2017, Twitter posted a calendar of upcoming changes related to enforcement. Among other things, Twitter promised to provide "a better experience for suspension appeals", including a detailed description to the user of how a suspended account violated the rules.

In November 2017, Twitter gave a deadline of 18 December to comply with their new policy, adding: "You also may not affiliate with organizations that—whether by their own statements or activity both on and off the platform—use or promote violence against civilians to further their causes". On 18 December, the accounts of several high-profile organizations were suspended.

Following Elon Musk's acquisition of Twitter in October 2022, it was reported that the platform was planning to end the use of permanent suspensions. In November 2022, Musk stated that accounts that engage in impersonation without a "clear" parody label would be permanently suspended without warning.

Many anti-fascist activists were purged from Twitter in November 2022 after Musk outsourced content moderation decisions to the platform's users, notably inviting right-wing journalist Andy Ngo to report anti-fascist accounts directly to him. Among those suspended were a group that provides armed security to LGBT events, accounts parodying Elon Musk, and a Palestinian news outlet known for criticizing the Israeli military.

At the end of 2024, Twitter released its first transparency report, stating that 5.3 million accounts were suspended in the first 6 months of 2024, (compared with 1.6 million suspensions in the first half of 2022, prior to Elon Musk's takeover). This did not include spam account suspensions, which totaled 464 million. However, many real users reported being incorrectly flagged and/or suspended for spam because they used a third-party applications to access Twitter, but they were never given an explanation.

The Better Business Bureau (BBB) has reportedly received multiple complaints regarding these account suspensions, but attempts to contact X have remained unanswered. The situation has raised concerns about potential violations of the Digital Services Act (DSA) in the European Union, particularly regarding platform transparency and user rights.

== Incidents ==
=== Rose McGowan ===
In October 2017, actress Rose McGowan said that Twitter had suspended her account for 12 hours after she repeatedly tweeted about former film studio executive Harvey Weinstein's alleged sexual misconduct toward her and others. Twitter explained that McGowan's account had violated its privacy policy because one of her tweets included a private phone number. According to The New York Times, "Many Twitter users expressed outrage over Ms. McGowan's account being locked". After the tweet was removed, her account was unlocked several hours before the 12-hour ban was set to expire. A Twitter representative stated, "We will be clearer about these policies and decisions in the future". Later that day, software engineer Kelly Ellis, using the hashtag #WomenBoycottTwitter, urged women to shun Twitter for 24 hours, beginning at midnight, in solidarity with McGowan and with "all the victims of hate and harassment Twitter fails to support". Several activists, celebrities, and journalists joined the boycott. Others criticized the level of organization and the fact that it was only 24 hours.

=== 2018 fake followers purge ===
On 11 July 2018, The New York Times reported that Twitter would begin to delete fake follower accounts to increase the authenticity of the platform.

The issue of fake follower accounts was highlighted in 2016 when Russian trolls, using both human-operated and bot accounts to appear legitimate, leveraged Twitter's reach among American voters in an interference campaign in that year's US elections.

Several celebrities and public figures lost substantial numbers of followers from their Twitter accounts before and after the closure of these accounts. These included Justin Bieber, Ellen DeGeneres, Jack Dorsey, Recep Tayyip Erdoğan, Ari Fleischer, Pope Francis, Lady Gaga, Ariana Grande, Kathy Ireland, Paul Kagame, Ashton Kutcher, The New York Times, Shaquille O'Neal, Barack Obama, Katy Perry, Queen Rania of Jordan, Rihanna, Cristiano Ronaldo, Taylor Swift, Donald Trump, Twitter themselves, Variety magazine, Kim Kardashian, Oprah Winfrey, and YouTube.

U.S. President Donald Trump said that social networks such as Twitter were "totally discriminating" against Republican Party and conservative users. Twitter and its CEO Jack Dorsey clarified that the reduction in the followers count was part of the platform's efforts to cut down on spamming and bot accounts. Dorsey's own account lost about 230,000 followers in the purge.

On 27 July 2018, Twitter's stock went down by 20.5% (equivalent to $6 billion). The user base declined to 325 million, down from 326 million.

=== Donald Trump ===
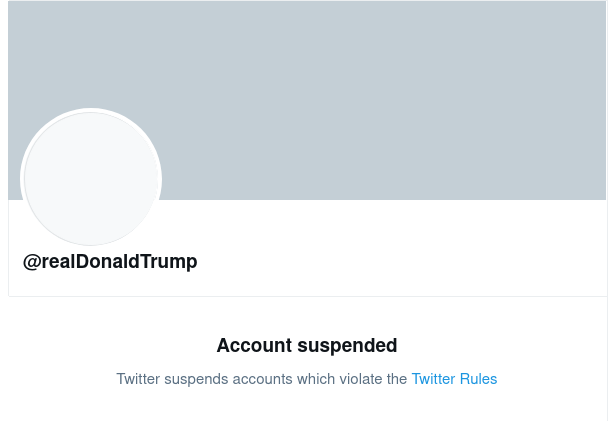
Trump's suspended account

On 7 January 2021, Twitter temporarily locked the account of U.S. President Donald Trump after multiple controversies, including his use of the platform to undermine the results of the 2020 presidential election and to incite the January 6 United States Capitol attack. On 8 January, Twitter permanently suspended Trump's account, citing his violation of Twitter's Glorification of Violence guidelines. Twitter also suspended or heavily moderated accounts that enabled Trump to circumvent his ban, including the official @POTUS handle. Trump congratulated Nigeria for blocking Twitter, and wrote that he had hosted Zuckerberg for dinner in White House. Twitter was criticized for banning Trump but deleting Ali Khamenei tweets. Twitter also suspended the "From the Desk of Donald J. Trump" (@DJTDesk) account, citing ban evasion as the reason.

On 13 January 2021, Twitter founder Jack Dorsey tweeted about Trump's Twitter ban, fearing that although the ban was the correct decision for Twitter as a company, Twitter's actions "set a precedent I feel is dangerous: the power an individual or corporation has over a part of the global public conversation". In 2022, Dorsey has continued voicing concern over Twitter's role in internet centralization with his tweet on 2 March, stating "centralizing discovery and identity into corporations really damaged the internet. I realize I'm partially to blame, and regret it". Internet centralization continues to be a riveting conversation surrounding Twitter and its banning policies.

On 19 November 2022, Trump's account was reinstated by Elon Musk. As late as August 2024, Trump had only used his Twitter account once in (August 2023 - posting about his mugshot) since its reinstatement, but had otherwise focused on making posts to his Truth Social social media platform. In August 2024, Trump began posting more frequently on his account. In February 2025, X settled a lawsuit filed by Trump in response to his suspension paying him approximately $10 million.

=== 2022 suspensions of journalists ===
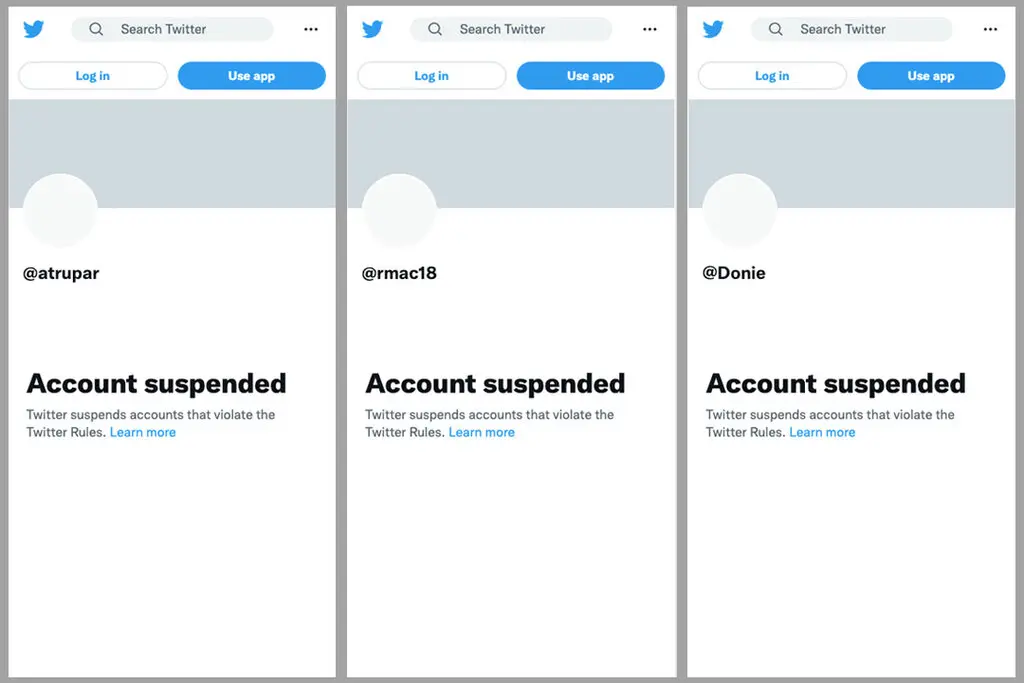
Three journalists suspended

On 15 December 2022, ten journalists, including journalists from The New York Times, CNN, Washington Post, and Voice of America had their accounts suspended. Musk claimed that the accounts had received a seven-day suspension for violating the platforms "doxxing" policy by sharing his "exact real-time location", with him comparing it to "assassination coordinates". However, it was reported that none of the suspended journalists had actually shared Musk's precise real-time location on their accounts.

The suspensions were condemned by the United Nations, while the European Union threatened sanctions against Twitter under the EU's Digital Services Act that is scheduled to take effect in 2023 and requires social media companies to "respect media freedom and fundamental rights". A number of American Democratic Party lawmakers also criticized the bans.

Reporters Without Borders warned that if the suspensions were in retaliation for the journalists' work on Musk, they would be a "serious violation of the journalists' right to report the news without fear of reprisal".

Most of the suspensions were lifted the next day, on 16 December 2022, after Musk put the decision on whether to reinstate the suspended accounts through an informal poll where 58.7% of voters chose lifting the suspensions immediately over 41.3% who voted to have the suspensions be lifted after 7 more days. The unbanned accounts remained restricted from posting until they removed the tweets that were claimed to be in violation of Twitter rules. Some of the journalists later appealed the decision, arguing their tweets were not in violation.

== List of notable suspensions ==
=== 2010–2015 ===
Individual/account	Description	Date	Duration	Reason for suspension
Operation Payback (@Anon_Operation)	Anonymous hacktivist campaign in support of online piracy and WikiLeaks	8 December 2010	Permanent	Coordinating denial-of-service attacks against PayPal, Mastercard and Visa.
Courtney Love (@CourtneyLoveUK)	American musician and actress	7 January 2011	Permanent (original account)	Suspended days after fashion designer Dawn Simorangkir filed a defamation suit against Love over tweets made on 17 March 2009. It was the first high-profile defamation trial over a celebrity's comments on Twitter. Love now uses a different account (@Courtney).
Michael Q Sullivan (@mqsullivan)	President of Empower Texans	18–21 July 2011	Temporary	Unknown.
Anders Behring Breivik (@AndersBBreivik)	Norwegian far-right terrorist and perpetrator of the 2011 Norway attacks	31 July 2011	Permanent	After Breivik was arrested, his account was hacked by Anonymous, who said they would delete it. It was later suspended.
Space Hijackers (@spacehijackers)	Anarchitects	23 May 2012	Temporary	Copyright complaint of the use of Olympics logo.
BILL NYE THO (@Bill_Nye_tho)	Parody account	18–19 July 2012	Temporary	Unknown.
Guy Adams (@guyadams)	British journalist for The Independent	30–31 July 2012	Temporary	Publishing the company email address of NBC executive Gary Zenkel during the 2012 Summer Olympics, for which NBC and Twitter were in a partnership. Twitter initially encouraged NBC to file a complaint, then later apologized and unsuspended Adams after NBC withdrew its complaint.
BILL NYE THO (@Bill_Nye_tho)	Parody account	19 September 2012	Permanent; later reinstated	Impersonating a public figure. His account was reinstated in October 2013.
Big Bird (@FiredBigBird)	Parody account	3–4 October 2012	Temporary	After Mitt Romney threatened to cut PBS funding, this account popped up posting doctored images of Big Bird in the unemployment line and begging. The account was suspended twice with the creator saying it might have been automated.
Nick Griffin (@nickgriffinmep)	Far-right British National Party leader	18–19 October 2012	Temporary	Publishing the address of a gay couple.
Anonymous (@YourAnonNews)	Hacktivist collective	19 December 2012	Temporary	Publishing personal information belonging to Westboro Baptist Church lawyer and member Shirley Phelps-Roper.
HSM Press Office (@HSMPress)	Al-Shabaab account	25 January 2013	Permanent	Announced a death threat against Kenyan hostages unless Kenya's government met its demands.
Burger King (@BurgerKing)	Restaurant account	18 February 2013	Temporary	A hacker changed the name to McDonald's and promoted their food.
HSMPress (@HSMPRESS1)	Al-Shabaab account	5 September 2013	Permanent	Threatening to kill the Somali President.
HSM Press (@HSM_Press)	Al-Shabaab account	21 September 2013	Permanent	Broadcasting their goals about the Westgate shopping mall attack.
شبكة شموخ الإسلام (@shomokhalislam)	Al-Qaeda account	29 September 2013	Permanent	Al-Qaeda's first official account.
Pace Picante (@Pace_Foods)	Spoof account	2 December 2013	Permanent	A fake employ 'Miles' started messaging to Kyle Kinane. Later turned out to be a prank pulled by comedian Randy Liedtke.
@Anon_Central and 30 other accounts	Hacktivists	3 December 2013	Permanent	Misogynist abuse aimed at feminist campaigners on the social network.
Izz ad-Din al-Qassam Brigades	Military wing of Hamas	11 January 2014	Permanent	Unspecified but likely connected to Hamas' classification in the US and elsewhere as a terrorist organization. The organization continued to create new accounts, which were later also suspended. Further purges of Hamas accounts took place in 2016 and 2019.
Phil Mason (@thunderf00t)	British chemist, YouTuber and anti-feminist vlogger	20 September 2014	Temporary	Violating Twitter's abusive behavior policy by sharing content targeting feminist media critic Anita Sarkeesian during the Gamergate controversy.
Darwin BondGraha (@DarwinBondGraha)	Journalist	11–12 December 2014	Temporary	Mistake after tweeting document obtained under state public records.
Godless Spellchecker (@GSpellchecker)	English atheist blogger and podcaster	3–5 January 2015	Temporary	Alleged "targeted abuse or harassment". He had been repeatedly suspended in the past.
Charles C. Johnson (@ChuckCJohnson, @GotNewsDotCom and @CitizenTrolling)	American alt-right blogger	24 May 2015	Permanent	Violating Twitter's rules "around participating in targeted abuse" by tweeting the day before about "taking out" civil rights activist DeRay Mckesson, which Mckesson perceived as "a serious threat". Temporarily suspended three times prior.
Jalibib Al-Jazrawi (@s_2f)	ISIL member	June 2015	Permanent	Making a death threat against Nasser Al Qasabi.
Jared Fogle (@thejaredfogle)	Subway spokesman	21 August 2015	Permanent	Pled guilty to possessing child pornography, soliciting minors for sex via the internet, and performing sex acts on minors, under a plea deal which sought to spare him a life sentence. Later sentenced to spend between 13 and 15.5 years in prison
George Zimmerman (@TherealGeorgeZ)	American man known for the killing of Trayvon Martin	3 December 2015	Permanent	Tweeting confidential information about an ex-girlfriend, including revenge porn.

=== 2016 ===
Individual/account	Description	Date	Duration	Reason for suspension
İyad el-Baghdadi (@iyad_elbaghdadi)	Arab Spring activist	1 January 2016	Temporary	Mistaken for ISIL leader Abu Bakr al-Baghdadi by Twitter staff.
Robert Stacy McCain (@rsmccain)	American conservative writer	25 February 2016	Permanent	Participating in targeted abuse.
Izz ad-Din al-Qassam Brigades	Military wing of Hamas	March 2016	Permanent	Twitter attempted to remove all official accounts of the terrorist organization, but the organization swiftly opened new accounts. More accounts were suspended in 2019.
Abu Obeida	Al-Qassam Brigades spokesperson	15 April 2016	Permanent	Twitter attempted to remove all official accounts of the terrorist organization, but the organization swiftly opened new accounts. More accounts were suspended in 2019.
Azealia Banks (@AZEALIABANKS)	American rapper	12 May 2016	Permanent	Making racist and homophobic posts towards singer Zayn Malik. Also made at least six other Twitter accounts over succeeding years, with bans in 2018, 2019, and 2020, before she was IP banned from the platform. She rejoined under the handle @Azealiaishere in April 2022 but this account was suspended two months later.
Milo Yiannopoulos (@nero)	British alt-right polemicist and political commentator	19 July 2016	Permanent; later reinstated	Insulting Leslie Jones coinciding with a racist harassment campaign. His account was reinstated on 23 May 2024.
Guccifer 2.0	Hacking group or individual	13 August 2016	Temporary	Posting information illegally hacked from the Democratic National Committee. Permanently suspended in 2018.
PewDiePie (@pewdiepie)	Swedish YouTuber	1 September 2016	Temporary	Pretending to be a member of ISIL.
Richard B. Spencer	American neo-Nazi	16 November – 12 December 2016	Temporary	Allegedly for using multiple overlapping accounts.
Various "alt-right" accounts		17 November 2016	Permanent	Including accounts of National Policy Institute, Radix Journal, Ricky Vaughn, John Rivers, and others; banned for violating Twitter's policy prohibiting users from "inciting or engaging in the targeted abuse or harassment of others".
Tila Tequila (@AngelTilaLove)	American social media personality	22 November 2016	Permanent	Temporarily suspended on 4 March 2016, possibly for racist and violent behavior. Permanently for making Neo-Nazi posts, including a photo of herself and other attendees rendering a Nazi salute at an event of the white nationalist National Policy Institute.
Jack Dorsey (@jack)	Twitter co-founder and CEO	22 November 2016	Temporary	After restoring his account, Dorsey tweeted the suspension was due to an "internal mistake".
John Rivello (@jew_goldstein)	Maryland Trump supporter	December 2016	Permanent	Sending an epileptogenic GIF to journalist with epilepsy Kurt Eichenwald.

=== 2017 ===
Individual/account	Description	Date	Duration	Reason for suspension
Martin Shkreli (@martinshkreli)	American hedge fund manager	7 January 2017	Permanent	Suspended for sexual harassment of journalist Lauren Duca.
Mocha Uson	Filipina entertainer and Rodrigo Duterte supporter	9 March 2017	Temporary	Unknown.
Abhijeet Bhattacharya	Indian singer	30 May 2017	Temporary	Harassing women including activist Shehla Rashid.
Daniel Sieradski (@selfagency)	American writer and activist	8 June 2017	Permanent	Unknown. Sieradski believes he was suspended for threatening violence against Baked Alaska or for arguing with Courtney Love about Linda Sarsour.
Al Jazeera Arabic	Arabic-language news broadcaster	17 June 2017	Temporary	Unknown.
Anthony Cumia (@AnthonyCumia)	American radio personality and broadcaster	11 July 2017	Permanent	Permanently suspended for a transphobic comment against The A.V. Club writer Katie Rife. Cumia then made several accounts to get around the initial ban, which were subsequently permanently suspended as well.
Popehat	American law blog	3 August 2017	Temporary	Posting personal information in screenshots of threats received.
Sargon Of Akkad (@Sargon_of_Akkad)	Alt-right activist	9 August 2017	Permanent; later reinstated (original account)	Unknown.
Alex Boivin	Twitter user	23 August 2017	Temporary	Suspended for sexual harassment of the cereal mascot Tony the Tiger.
@nemuismywife	Japanese man	30 August 2017	Permanent (original account)	Account permanently suspended for making a death threat towards a dead mosquito. The man started a new account.
Joseph Cox	Journalist for The Daily Beast	30 August 2017	Temporary	Targeted by bots after writing story about suspicious activity by pro-Kremlin bots.
Elizabeth Johnston	Christian blogger	31 August 2017	Temporary	Criticizing article of Teen Vogue which promoted anal sex amongst teenagers.
@themoodforluv	American woman	7 September 2017	Permanent	Targeted abuse of singer Taylor Swift.
Rose McGowan	American actress and activist	12 October 2017	Temporary	Account temporarily suspended for posting a private phone number.
Roger Stone (@RogerJStoneJr)	American conservative political consultant and lobbyist	29 October 2017	Permanent; later reinstated	Banned for harassment of CNN journalists. Stone later threatened legal action against Twitter. The account was later reinstated on 7 December 2022.
Kamaal Rashid Khan	Indian actor and film critic	30 October 2017	Permanent (original account)	After the ban, Khan announced his intention to take legal action against Twitter; he later created a new account.
Andrew Tate (@cobratate)	Men's rights activist	31 October 2017	Permanent; later reinstated (original account)	For saying rape victims "bear some responsibility" for putting themselves in a position to be assaulted.
2752 Russian troll accounts		1 November 2017	Permanent	Twitter's internal investigation linked the accounts to Russia's Internet Research Agency.
"Jenna Abrams" (@Jenn_Abrams)	Alt-right blogger	2 November 2017	Permanent	Unmasked as a fictitious person operated by a Russian troll factory.
Donald Trump (@realDonaldTrump)	President of the United States	3 November 2017	Temporary	Account briefly deactivated by a rogue Twitter employee on their last workday.
Robert Delaware	American man	6 November 2017	Temporary	Mistaken for a Russian troll account.
Talib Kweli	Musician	14 November 2017	Temporary	Account locked after posting business address of online harasser who posted threats and racist slurs; restored after he deleted the tweet. The account of the harasser, extremist attorney Jason Lee Van Dyke, was suspended.
Baked Alaska (@bakedalaska)	Alt-right activist	15 November 2017	Permanent; later reinstated	Repeated and/or non-consensual slurs, epithets, racist and sexist tropes, or other content that degrades someone, and posting a photoshopped image of Laura Loomer inside a gas chamber. After five years, Baked Alaska's account was reinstated on 10 December 2022.
Pakistan Defence Forum (@defencepk)	Forum for discussing Pakistan's armed forces	19 November 2017	Permanent	Suspended for posting doctored photo and fake news.
Wael Abbas (@waelabbas)	Egyptian journalist, blogger, and human rights activist	15 December 2017	Permanent	Unknown.
Paul Golding (@GoldingBF) and	Leader of fascist group Britain First	18 December 2017	Permanent	Contravention of new rule about people 'that affiliate with organizations that use or promote violence against civilians to further their causes'. The organization had posted videos with false and misleading captions attributing violence to Muslims, which were re-tweeted by Donald Trump.
Jayda Fransen (@JaydaBF)	Deputy leader of fascist group Britain First	18 December 2017	Permanent	Contravention of new rule about people 'that affiliate with organizations that use or promote violence against civilians to further their causes'. The organization had posted videos with false and misleading captions attributing violence to Muslims, which were re-tweeted by Donald Trump.
Nordic Resistance Movement (@nordicfrontier)	Nordic white nationalists	18 December 2017	Permanent	Affiliation with organizations that use or promote violence against civilians to further their causes.
Jared Taylor (@jartaylor) and American Renaissance	American white nationalists	18 December 2017	Permanent	Affiliation with organizations that use or promote violence against civilians to further their causes.
Michael Hill (@MickCollins1951) and League of the South	American white nationalists	18 December 2017	Permanent	Affiliation with organizations that use or promote violence against civilians to further their causes.
Traditionalist Worker Party	American white nationalists	18 December 2017	Permanent	Affiliation with organizations that use or promote violence against civilians to further their causes.
American Nazi Party (@ANP14)	American Nazis	18 December 2017	Permanent	Affiliation with organizations that use or promote violence against civilians to further their causes.
fuck every word (@fuckeveryword)	Twitter bot	20 December 2017	Permanent; later reinstated	Tweeting "fuck niggers". The account was later reinstated on 25 June 2023.
James Allsup (@realJamesAllsup)	Far-right political commentator	26 December 2017	Permanent	Unknown.
Tyler Barriss (@SWAuTistic)	Suspect in deadly 2017 Wichita swatting incident	30 December 2017	Permanent	Barriss' account was suspended after the Los Angeles police arrested him as the suspected "swatter" who later pled guilty to placing a fake 911 call that led a police officer to kill an innocent man in Wichita, Kansas.

=== 2018 ===
Individual/account	Description	Date	Duration	Reason for suspension
David Clarke	American former sheriff of Milwaukee County, Wisconsin	2 January 2018	Temporary	Suspended for three posts that appeared to encourage violence against the media, including one tweet stating: "Punch them in the nose & MAKE THEM TASTE THEIR OWN BLOOD". Suspension lifted after Clarke deleted the posts.
Golden Dawn	Greek ultranationalist party	5 January 2018	Permanent	Broadening of hateful conduct policy to encompass incitement to violence.
Paul Nehlen (@pnehlen)	Congressional candidate challenging Speaker Paul Ryan in Republican primary	13 February 2018	Permanent	Banned after posting a racist tweet targeting Meghan, Duchess of Sussex (also known as Meghan Markle).
Tommy Robinson (@TRobinsonNewEra)	British nationalist	28 March 2018	Permanent	Hateful conduct.
Craig R. Brittain (@SenatorBrittain)	Republican US Senate candidate in Arizona, former operator of "revenge porn" website	30 March 2018	Permanent	Suspended after suggesting that the survivors of the Parkland, Florida Stoneman Douglas High School shooting, had been paid by firearms regulation groups. Brittain sued Twitter for banning his accounts. The suit was dismissed as frivolous.
Owen Benjamin (@OwenBenjamin)	American comedian and far-right conspiracy theorist	5 April 2018	Permanent	Offensive tweets directed at David Hogg.
Sabo (@UnsavoryAgents)	American street artist	13 April 2018	Permanent	Unknown.
Mike Enoch (@mikeenochsback)	White nationalist	16 April 2018	Permanent	Hateful conduct.
Bezalel Smotrich	Israeli politician and Knesset member	23 April 2018	Temporary	Suspended for 12 hours for "offensive behavior" after tweeting, regarding Ahed Tamimi, a 17-year-old Palestinian serving an eight-month jail sentence for a videotaped assault of an Israeli soldier: "In my opinion, she should have gotten a bullet, at least in the kneecap".
Bkub Okawa (@bkub_comic)	Creator of Pop Team Epic	8 June 2018	Temporary	Unknown; possibly due to either a coordinated campaign by his critics or for making a flippant comment about wanting to kill someone over an argument about Lawson products.
Masao Shiro (@mr_beck36)	Mangaka	8 June 2018	Permanent	Using the word jjokbari, a Korean anti-Japanese slur, while suggesting an anime adaptation of his manga Taekwondoer Park.
Splinter News and other users	American news site	20 June 2018	Temporary	Linking to their story featuring and posting Stephen Miller's cell phone number.
@EricHartleyFrnd	Account used by Jarrod Ramos	28 June 2018	Permanent	Jarrod Ramos was arrested after he shot and killed five employees at The Capital during the mass shooting.
"Darren Mills"	Russian-linked account	4 July 2018	Permanent	Unmasked as a fictitious person operated by a Russian troll factory.
70 million automated, troll, and fake accounts		6 July 2018	Permanent	Part of a crackdown on malicious activity.
Guccifer 2.0 (@GUCCIFER_2)	Russian-linked accounts	14 July 2018	Permanent	Connected to a network of accounts previously suspended for operating in violation of Twitter's rules.
DCLeaks (@dcleaks_)	Russian-linked accounts	14 July 2018	Permanent	Connected to a network of accounts previously suspended for operating in violation of Twitter's rules.
Peter van Buren (@WeMeantWell)	Former United States Foreign Service employee and writer	5 August 2018	Permanent	Banned for harassing Jonathan M. Katz in posts.
Candace Owens	American conservative activist	5 August 2018	Temporary	Banned in error after tweeting the content of several Sarah Jeong's controversial tweets about white people, and changing races and religions mentioned in the tweets.
Blair Cottrell	Australian far-right activist and former leader of the United Patriots Front	7 August 2018	Temporary	Joking about raping Sky News Australia presenter Laura Jayes.
Proud Boys (@ProudBoysUSA)	North American neo-fascist organization	11 August 2018	Permanent	Violating policy on "violent extremist groups".
Gavin McInnes (@Gavin_McInnes)	Founder of the neo-fascist organization Proud Boys	11 August 2018	Permanent; later reinstated	Violating policy on "violent extremist groups".
Talbert W. Swan II	American prelate of the Church of God in Christ	22 August 2018	Permanent; later reinstated	Hateful conduct. Possibly for calling Candace Owens a "coon". Swan's account was reinstated on 4 September 2018, which he attributed to thousands of his followers calling for Twitter to lift the suspension.
Becky Lucas	Australian comedian	September 2018	Permanent (original account)	Posting "content that was threatening and/or promoting violence" by jokingly tweeting, "Oi @ScottMorrisonMP I'm gonna chop your fucking head off". Lucas now uses a new account.
InfoWars (@infowars)	American conspiracy website	6 September 2018	Permanent; later reinstated	Alex Jones was first suspended for a week on 14 August 2018 for violating policy on "inciting violence", and was later banned on 6 September for violating policy on "abusive behaviour". Both accounts were later reinstated on 9 December 2023.
Alex Jones (@RealAlexJones)	Founder of the conspiracy website InfoWars	6 September 2018	Permanent; later reinstated	Alex Jones was first suspended for a week on 14 August 2018 for violating policy on "inciting violence", and was later banned on 6 September for violating policy on "abusive behaviour". Both accounts were later reinstated on 9 December 2023.
Kris Paronto	Former US Army Ranger	10 September 2018	Temporary	Using the word "retard" and the hashtags #YouAreAnIdiot and #NeverGoFullRetard.
James Woods	American actor	20 September 2018	Temporary	Posting hoax political meme on 20 July 2018, specifically a fake message, supposedly from Democrats, that urged men not to vote in the midterm elections. Woods received an email from Twitter stating that the tweet had "the potential to be misleading in a way that could impact an election". Woods refused to delete the tweet himself. He was allowed to return in October 2018.
@CongressEdits	Twitter bot	3 October 2018	Permanent	Automatically rebroadcasting Wikipedia edits that doxed members of Congress.
Dozens of Occupy movement activists		11 October 2018	Permanent	No explanation from Twitter.
@Infowars_EU	Accounts affiliated with Alex Jones and InfoWars	22 October 2018	Permanent	Ties with Alex Jones and InfoWars after "numerous violations and warnings".
@InfowarsArmy	Accounts affiliated with Alex Jones and InfoWars	22 October 2018	Permanent	Ties with Alex Jones and InfoWars after "numerous violations and warnings".
@InfowarsCrew	Accounts affiliated with Alex Jones and InfoWars	22 October 2018	Permanent	Ties with Alex Jones and InfoWars after "numerous violations and warnings".
@InfowarsInsider	Accounts affiliated with Alex Jones and InfoWars	22 October 2018	Permanent	Ties with Alex Jones and InfoWars after "numerous violations and warnings".
@InfowarsMag	Accounts affiliated with Alex Jones and InfoWars	22 October 2018	Permanent	Ties with Alex Jones and InfoWars after "numerous violations and warnings".
@InfowarsPapers	Accounts affiliated with Alex Jones and InfoWars	22 October 2018	Permanent	Ties with Alex Jones and InfoWars after "numerous violations and warnings".
@InfowarsReports	Accounts affiliated with Alex Jones and InfoWars	22 October 2018	Permanent	Ties with Alex Jones and InfoWars after "numerous violations and warnings".
@InfowarsShop	Accounts affiliated with Alex Jones and InfoWars	22 October 2018	Permanent	Ties with Alex Jones and InfoWars after "numerous violations and warnings".
@PrisonPlanetTV	Accounts affiliated with Alex Jones and InfoWars	22 October 2018	Permanent	Ties with Alex Jones and InfoWars after "numerous violations and warnings".
@RealInfoStore	Accounts affiliated with Alex Jones and InfoWars	22 October 2018	Permanent	Ties with Alex Jones and InfoWars after "numerous violations and warnings".
@RealNewsX2	Accounts affiliated with Alex Jones and InfoWars	22 October 2018	Permanent	Ties with Alex Jones and InfoWars after "numerous violations and warnings".
@TheNewsWars	Accounts affiliated with Alex Jones and InfoWars	22 October 2018	Permanent	Ties with Alex Jones and InfoWars after "numerous violations and warnings".
@WarRoomMemes	Accounts affiliated with Alex Jones and InfoWars	22 October 2018	Permanent	Ties with Alex Jones and InfoWars after "numerous violations and warnings".
@WarRoomShow	Accounts affiliated with Alex Jones and InfoWars	22 October 2018	Permanent	Ties with Alex Jones and InfoWars after "numerous violations and warnings".
4 other accounts	Accounts affiliated with Alex Jones and InfoWars	22 October 2018	Permanent	Ties with Alex Jones and InfoWars after "numerous violations and warnings".
@hardrock2016	Accounts used by Cesar Sayoc	26 October 2018	Permanent	After the mail bombing attempts against Donald Trump critics and Democratic Party politicians, Sayoc's profiles were found to have posted far-right political conspiracy theories, graphic images and specific threats.
@hardrockintlet	Accounts used by Cesar Sayoc	26 October 2018	Permanent	After the mail bombing attempts against Donald Trump critics and Democratic Party politicians, Sayoc's profiles were found to have posted far-right political conspiracy theories, graphic images and specific threats.
Smash Racism D.C. (@SmashRacismDC)	Antifa group from Washington, D.C.	7 November 2018	Permanent	Posting the home addresses of Tucker Carlson along with other family members following a protest outside Carlson's home.
Meghan Murphy (@MeghanEMurphy)	Canadian journalist	15 November 2018	Permanent; later reinstated	Banned for "hateful conduct" following a heated exchange which involved misgendering a transgender woman.
Laura Loomer (@LauraLoomer)	American political activist, conspiracy theorist and Internet personality	22 November 2018	Permanent; later reinstated	Hateful conduct, suspended for a tweet attacking Ilhan Omar by accusing her of being "pro-Sharia" and "pro-FGM".
Jesse Kelly	Conservative talk radio host and former Republican congressional candidate	25 November 2018	Temporary	Kelly indicated in comments to other conservatives that he received a message saying that his account was "permanently suspended due to multiple or repeat violations of the Twitter rules"; however, Twitter, when contacted by The Hill after Kelly returned, described it as temporary.
@putinRF_eng	Impostor	26 November 2018	Permanent	Impersonating Russian president Vladimir Putin after a complaint to Twitter from Russian officials.
Amos Yee (@TheAmosYee)	Singaporean blogger	10 December 2018	Permanent	Permanently banned for supporting pedophilia.
Andile Mngxitama	Leader of the Black First Land First	17 December 2018	Temporary	Banned for a minimum of seven days after Mngxitama made threats to kill 5 White South Africans for every taxi driver killed in response to comments made by businessman Johann Rupert.

=== 2019 ===
Individual/account	Description	Date	Duration	Reason for suspension
Stephanie Sargnagel	Austrian author and artist	31 January 2019	Permanent; later reinstated	Suspended for posting tweet that translates to: 'Austria, you stupid son of a bitch, I am going to kill you'.
Ali Khamenei (@khamenei_ir)	Supreme Leader of Iran	February 2019	Temporary	Account locked for 24 hours for posting a tweet endorsing the 1989 fatwa against Salman Rushdie.
Jacob Wohl (@JacobAWohl)	American conspiracy theorist, fraudster and hoaxer	26 February 2019	Permanent	Creating and operating fake accounts after boasting he intended to manipulate the 2020 United States presidential election results in a USA Today interview.
Brenton Tarrant (@BrentonTarrant)	Perpetrator of the Christchurch mosque shootings	15 March 2019	Permanent	Posting pictures of the firearms he later used in the attacks.
Carl Benjamin (@CarlUKIP)	UKIP accounts	26 April 2019	Permanent	Violating Twitter's terms of service.
Tommy Robinson (@TRobinsonMEP)	UKIP accounts	26 April 2019	Permanent	Violating Twitter's terms of service.
Correo del Orinoco	Pro-Maduro Venezuelan newspapers	1 May 2019	Unknown	Unspecified; occurred during the 2019 Venezuela uprising.
Diario VEA	Pro-Maduro Venezuelan newspapers	1 May 2019	Unknown	Unspecified; occurred during the 2019 Venezuela uprising.
David Horowitz (@horowitz39)	Conservative activist and author	7 May 2019	Temporary	Unknown.
Min Aung Hlaing (@SGMinAungHlaing)	Commander-in-Chief of Tatmadaw	16 May 2019	Permanent	Spreading propaganda against Rohingya people.
Chiitan (@ogecebel)	Mascot of the town of Susaki, Japan	17 May 2019	Permanent (original account)	Unknown.
Nebojša Krstić (@Krle22)	Serbian pundit aligned with the Serbian Progressive Party	17 May 2019	Permanent	Harassment of Vreme journalist Jovana Gligorijević.
Brian Krassenstein (@krassenstein)	Resistance Twitter activists	23 May 2019	Permanent; later reinstated	Operating fake accounts.
Ed Krassenstein (@EdKrassen)	Resistance Twitter activists	23 May 2019	Permanent; later reinstated	Operating fake accounts.
Eoin Lenihan (@EoinLenihan)	Researcher and educator	29 May 2019	Permanent; later reinstated	Banned from Twitter for abusing multiple accounts.
@TheTweetOfGod	Account operated by David Javerbaum	11 June 2019	Temporary	Tweeting, "If gay people are a mistake, they're a mistake I've made hundreds of millions of times, which proves I'm incompetent and shouldn't be relied upon for anything".
Luke Taylor (@luketaylorjail)	Internet troll	8 July 2019	Permanent	Sustained harassment of the Planters snack food mascot, Mr. Peanut.
Louis Farrakhan	Leader of the Nation of Islam	9 July 2019	Temporary	Banned for using "language that dehumanizes others on the basis of religion".
Lindsay Shepherd	Free-speech activist	16 July 2019	Permanent; later reinstated	Banned for "hateful conduct" following a heated exchange with a transgender woman and LGBTQ advocate from Vancouver.
Connor Stephen Betts (@iamthespookster)	Perpetrator of the 2019 Dayton shooting	4 August 2019	Permanent	
Patrick Wood Crusius (@PatrickCrusius)	Perpetrator of the 2019 El Paso shooting	4 August 2019	Permanent	
Team Mitch (@Team_Mitch)	Political campaign for US Senator Mitch McConnell	7–9 August 2019	Temporary	Posting a video that included violent threats against McConnell.
200,000 Chinese accounts		19 August 2019	Permanent	Believed the accounts were part of a Chinese government influence campaign targeting the protest movement in Hong Kong.
Pauline Hanson	Australian senator and leader of Pauline Hanson's One Nation	22 August 2019	Temporary	Suspended for "violating rules against abuse and harassment" by posting video advocating the use of violence against protesters.
Raúl Castro (@RaulCastroR)	Cuban government-affiliated accounts	12 September 2019	Permanent	Unspecified breach of rules.
Mariela Castro (@castroespinm)	Cuban government-affiliated accounts	12 September 2019	Temporary	Unspecified breach of rules.
Mesa Redonda (@mesaredondacuba)	Cuban government-affiliated accounts	12 September 2019	Temporary	Unspecified breach of rules.
Granma Digital (@Granma_Digital)	Cuban government-affiliated accounts	12 September 2019	Temporary	Unspecified breach of rules.
Radio Rebelde (@radiorebeldecu)	Cuban government-affiliated accounts	12 September 2019	Temporary	Unspecified breach of rules.
Briscoe Cain	Republican member of the Texas House of Representatives	13 September 2019	Temporary	Suspended for 141 days after refusing to remove a perceived violent threat against Democratic presidential candidate Beto O'Rourke.
Saud al-Qahtani (@saudq1978)	Former media consultant to Saudi Crown Prince Mohammad bin Salman	20 September 2019	Permanent	Banned for violating the company's "platform manipulation" policies.
DotDev.ae	Operator of bot accounts in the United Arab Emirates	20 September 2019	Permanent	Spreading information about Qatar and the Saudi Arabian-led intervention in Yemen.
Hamas and Hezbollah–affiliated accounts, including Al-Manar and the Quds News Network		1 November 2019	Permanent	Part of Twitter's crackdown on "illegal terrorist organizations and violent extremist groups", conducted after reviewing accounts highlighted by US representatives Josh Gottheimer, Tom Reed, Max Rose, and Brian Fitzpatrick, who accused Twitter of violating the law by doing business with "foreign terrorist organizations". Twitter reversed its previous decision to allow a platform for non-military arms of terrorist organizations.
Will Sloan	Canadian film critic and podcaster	21 November 2019	Temporary	Suspended for tweets about the fictional character Baby Yoda.
Danielle Stella (@2020MNCongress)	Republican candidate potentially challenging US Rep. Ilhan Omar in the 2020 election	27 November 2019	Permanent	Repeated rule violations; one tweet read, "If it is proven @IlhanMN [Ilhan Omar] passed sensitive info to Iran, she should be tried for #treason and hanged".
Pete Hegseth	Fox News contributor	8 December 2019	Temporary	Banned for posting an anti-American manifesto that was written by Mohammed Alshamrani, the Saudi Arabian military cadet who shot and killed three people and injured 12 when he opened fire at Naval Air Station Pensacola on 6 December 2019.
88,000 Saudi-linked accounts		20 December 2019	Permanent	State-backed information operations originating in Saudi Arabia that "violated platform manipulation policies".

=== 2020 ===
Individual/account	Description	Date	Duration	Reason for suspension
Dozen accounts associated with Venezuela's government and military		8 January 2020	Unknown	Unspecified breach of rules.
Zero Hedge (@zerohedge)	Far-right libertarian financial blog	31 January 2020	Permanent; later reinstated	Publishing an article falsely accusing a Wuhan Institute of Virology doctor of releasing SARS-CoV-2 as a biological weapon and doxxing said doctor. The account was reinstated in June 2020 with Twitter saying the suspension was in error.
@BabyNutBaby	Meme accounts tied to Planters	3 February 2020	Permanent	Astroturfing in support of the "Baby Nut" campaign. The main Mr. Peanut (@MrPeanut) account was not suspended.
@BabyNutLOL	Meme accounts tied to Planters	3 February 2020	Permanent	Astroturfing in support of the "Baby Nut" campaign. The main Mr. Peanut (@MrPeanut) account was not suspended.
@BabyNutMemes	Meme accounts tied to Planters	3 February 2020	Permanent	Astroturfing in support of the "Baby Nut" campaign. The main Mr. Peanut (@MrPeanut) account was not suspended.
70 pro–Michael Bloomberg accounts		21 February 2020	Permanent	Posting identical messages, which Twitter said amounted to spam and "platform manipulation".
Andrew Walz (@WalzRI)	Fake Republican candidate account	28 February 2020	Permanent	A fake account claiming to be a Republican running for Congress in Rhode Island's 1st congressional district, whose teenaged operator tricked Twitter into blue check verifying it.
Jack Burkman (@Jack_Burkman)	Lobbyist and conspiracy theorist	19 March 2020	Permanent	Tweeted unevidenced claims about impending nationwide food shortages due to the COVID-19 pandemic, following repeated infractions of Twitter rules, including making false statements about COVID-19.
Jaboukie Young-White (@jaboukie)	American comedian	23 March 2020	Temporary	Impersonating verified accounts such as CNN. Young-White's account was later restored, although it was stripped of its verified status.
The Federalist (@FDRLST)	American conservative website	25 March 2020	Temporary	Account locked for promoting an article advocating COVID-19 pox parties, which was harshly criticized by public health officials.
8558 pro–Serbian Progressive Party and pro-Aleksandar Vučić accounts		2 April 2020	Permanent	Posting positive news coverage of the Serbian Progressive Party and Aleksandar Vučić and attacking their political opponents, with Twitter saying that the accounts "engaged in inauthentic coordinated activity".
Metawin Opas-iamkajorn (@Winmetawin)	Thai actor	8 April 2020	Temporary	Unspecified.
Chinese embassy in Sri Lanka (@ChinaEmbSL)	Chinese government agency	13 April 2020	Temporary	For using undiplomatic language against social media users while responding to allegations against China.
Owen Shroyer (@allidoisowen)	InfoWars personalities	16 April 2020	Permanent	Promoting violence in a Texas rally against the stay-at-home order during the COVID-19 pandemic and evading the permanent suspension of Alex Jones and InfoWars.
Rob Dew (@DewsNewz)	InfoWars personalities	16 April 2020	Permanent	Promoting violence in a Texas rally against the stay-at-home order during the COVID-19 pandemic and evading the permanent suspension of Alex Jones and InfoWars.
Banned.Video (@BANNEDdotVIDEO)	InfoWars personalities	16 April 2020	Permanent	Promoting violence in a Texas rally against the stay-at-home order during the COVID-19 pandemic and evading the permanent suspension of Alex Jones and InfoWars.
Alex (@alx)	Turning Point USA ambassador	17 April 2020	Permanent; later reinstated	Violating Twitter's manipulation and spam policy after sharing a meme of Xi Jinping generated by using Joe Biden's avatar generator from his website. His account was reinstated on 20 November 2022.
Candace Owens (@RealCandaceO)	American conservative activist	2 May 2020	Temporary	Banned after tweeting criticism of Michigan Governor Gretchen Whitmer's stay-at-home order and encouraging the state's citizens to violate the directive.
Joey Salads (@JoeySalads)	American conservative media personality	12 May 2020	Permanent	Violating Twitter's manipulation and spam policy.
@ANTIFA_US	Fake Antifa account	2 June 2020	Permanent	Fake antifa account created by white supremacists; suspended for violating the policy on fake accounts.
170,000 Chinese, 1000 Russian, and 7340 Turkish accounts		11 June 2020	Permanent	Found to be linked to propaganda and disinformation supportive of their respective governments.
Katie Hopkins (@KTHopkins)	British columnist and far-right activist	19 June 2020	Permanent	Temporarily on 30 January 2020 possibly due to a tweet she made about rapper Stormzy. Permanently, for "violations of the hateful conduct policy" after she voiced opposition to a school program providing meals for hungry children.
Logan Cook (@carpedonktum)	Pro-Trump meme account	23 June 2020	Permanent	Account suspended for half an hour on 14 October 2019 for sharing an edited scene from the 20th Century Studios' film Kingsman: The Secret Service depicting Trump murdering journalists, politicians, and news outlets. Permanently banned for "repeated violations of this policy" after he created a fake CNN "racist toddlers" video of two toddlers, one black and one white, running toward each other and hugging, before running away together which Twitter added a "manipulated media" label on the video as racist. The video was taken down by Twitter following a copyright complaint made by the original content owner.
Distributed Denial of Secrets (@DDoSecrets)	Activist group	23 June 2020	Permanent	Publishing BlueLeaks, 269 gigabytes of internal US law enforcement data obtained by the hacker collective Anonymous, for "dissemination of hacked materials" and "information that could have put individuals at risk of real-world harm".
Graham Linehan (@Glinner)	Television writer	27 June 2020	Permanent; later reinstated and then later suspended	Repeated acts of platform manipulation and hateful conduct towards transgender individuals. In December 2020, Linehan attempted to circumvent the ban by activating another new account (@scarlysimon), which was subsequently permanently suspended as well. The account was later reinstated on 22 December 2022. It was later suspended on 15 April 2023.
Conservative Party of New York State	Political party	July 2020	Temporary	An automated spam filter had misidentified the party account as disseminating spam. Twitter undid the error on 10 September, two months after the erroneous suspension.
Stefan Molyneux (@stefanmolyneux)	Far-right activist and conspiracy theorist	7 July 2020	Permanent; later reinstated	Operating fake accounts.
Over 50 accounts of white nationalist organizations from several countries, including Martin Sellner (@Martin_Sellner)		10 July 2020	Permanent; later reinstated	"Violating [Twitter's] policies in relation to violent extremism". Sellner was unsuspended in March 2024.
Various users		15 July 2020	Unknown	Posting screenshots of Twitter internal control panels following the 2020 Twitter bitcoin scam.
Approx. 157,000 QAnon-related accounts		21 July 2020	7000 banned permanently, 150,000 limited	Engaged in harassment and brigading of other users and misinformation.
Talib Kweli	Rapper	23 July 2020	Permanent	Harassment.
16 pro-Jair Bolsonaro accounts		24 July 2020	Permanent	Removed on order of the Supreme Federal Court of Brazil for allegedly promoting fake news including the accounts of Roberto Jefferson, Luciano Hang, Sara Winter, and others.
Wiley (@WileyCEO)	Musician	25 July 2020	Permanent	Antisemitic comments.
Donald Trump Jr. (@DonaldJTrumpJr)	American businessman and eldest son of U.S. President Donald Trump	28 July 2020	Temporary	Blocked for 12 hours for spreading the debunked claim that Hydroxychloroquine can prevent COVID-19.
David Duke (@DrDavidDuke)	White supremacist and former KKK Grand Wizard	30 July 2020	Permanent	Temporarily suspended in August 2017 for association with the Unite the Right rally. Permanently suspended in July 2020 for hateful content.
Gemma O'Doherty (@gemmaod1)	Irish far-right activist and conspiracy theorist	31 July 2020	Permanent	Repeated violations of Twitter rules on hateful conduct and abusive behaviour.
Bill Mitchell (@mitchellvii)	Conservative pundit	14 August 2020	Permanent	Using an account to evade the suspension of another account.
Guy Verhoftwat (@guyverhoftwat)	Political satire accounts	17 August 2020	Permanent	Violating Twitter's manipulation and spam policy.
Jarvis DuPont (@JarvisDuPont)	Political satire accounts	17 August 2020	Permanent	Violating Twitter's manipulation and spam policy.
Journalist Excellence Worldwide (@journalistew)	Political satire accounts	17 August 2020	Permanent	Violating Twitter's manipulation and spam policy.
Liberal Larry (@larrydaliberal)	Political satire accounts	17 August 2020	Permanent	Violating Twitter's manipulation and spam policy.
Sir Lefty Farr-Wright (@supportourlefty)	Political satire accounts	17 August 2020	Permanent	Violating Twitter's manipulation and spam policy.
Tolerance Police (@diversitypatrol)	Political satire accounts	17 August 2020	Permanent	Violating Twitter's manipulation and spam policy.
NPC Daily	Political satire accounts	17 August 2020	Temporary	Violating Twitter's manipulation and spam policy.
The Babylon Bee (@TheBabylonBee)	Political satire accounts	17 August 2020	Temporary	Violating Twitter's manipulation and spam policy.
Titania McGrath (@TitaniaMcGrath)	Political satire accounts	17 August 2020	Temporary	Violating Twitter's manipulation and spam policy.
3000 Chinese accounts		26 August 2020	Permanent	Part of a Chinese botnet known as "Dracula".
Unity 2020 (@ArticlesofUnity)	American political movement	27 August 2020	Permanent	Considered "potentially harmful".
AlwaysActions (@AlwaysActions)	Conservative account	10 September 2020	Permanent	Violating Twitter's manipulation and spam policy after repeatedly sharing xenophobic, anti-Muslim, and hyper-partisan disinformation; U.S. President Donald Trump promoted several of the account's tweets.
David Vance (@DVATW)	Right-wing blogger	10 September 2020	Permanent; later reinstated	Hateful content for repeated accusations of racism including harassing footballer Marcus Rashford.
Li-Meng Yan (@LiMengYAN119)	Chinese virologist	15 September 2020	Permanent (original account)	Li-Meng Yan's first account permanently suspended for linking to an upload of an unpublished pre-print paper claiming SARS-CoV-2 was made in a laboratory; she later created a new account (@DrLiMengYAN1).
Kanye West (@kanyewest)	American musician and U.S. presidential candidate	16 September 2020	Temporary	Publishing the phone number of Forbes magazine editor Randall Lane.
About Hungary (@abouthungary)	Official account of the Government of Hungary	30 September 2020	Temporary	Unknown.
Remix News (@RMXnews)	Hungarian government-supported media publication	30 September 2020	Permanent	Unknown.
Numerous suspicious accounts claiming to be Black supporters of Donald Trump		13 October 2020	Permanent	Violating Twitter's rules on spam and platform manipulation.
New York Post (@nypost)	Tabloid newspaper	15 October 2020	Temporary	Account locked for tweeting articles alleging corruption and attempted collusion between Burisma and Joe Biden.
Charlie Kirk (@charliekirk11)	Founder of Turning Point USA	17 October 2020	Temporary	Spreading misleading information about mail-in ballots in Pennsylvania.
Gayathri Raguram (@gayathriraguram)	Indian politician, choreographer, and actress	26 October 2020	Permanent	Violating Twitter's rules after posting a series of tweets relating to the controversy over VCK leader Thol. Thirumavalavan's statement on Manusmriti.
Ira Madison III (@ira)	Writer and podcaster	2 November 2020	Permanent	Impersonating Beto O'Rourke.
DeAnna Lorraine (@DeAnna4Congress)	Former Republican candidate for the US House of Representatives	3 November 2020	Permanent; later reinstated	Repeated violations of the Twitter rules; tweeting that "immigrants would enter the US and commit violence if Trump is not elected".
Numerous accounts claiming to be independent journalists		3 November 2020	Permanent; later reinstated	Violating Twitter's rules on spam and platform manipulation.
The Chaser (@chaser)	Australian comedy group and satirical news publication	3 November 2020	Temporary	Impersonating Donald Trump and tweeting "Don't vote for me, I'm a massive idiot". The account was restored the next day but lost its verification.
David Icke (@davidicke)	English conspiracy theorist	4 November 2020	Permanent; later reinstated	Violating Twitter's rules on COVID-19 misinformation.
Steve Bannon (@WarRoomPandemic)	Former White House Chief Strategist to Donald Trump	5 November 2020	Permanent	Banned after he called for Anthony Fauci and Christopher A. Wray to be beheaded on his podcast.
Mohsen Rezaee (@ir_rezaee)	Iranian politician and secretary of the Expediency Discernment Council	9 November 2020	Permanent	Violating Twitter's rules against abusive behavior.
Bijan Namdar Zangeneh	Iranian Minister of Petroleum	15 November 2020	Permanent	Banned because it violated the website's rules against impersonation.
True Indology (@tiinexile)	Indian right-wing historian account	17 November 2020	Permanent	Banned after online banter with senior IPS officer.
@TheBettyTrump	Elizabeth Trump Grau imposter	20 November 2020	Permanent	Impersonating Donald Trump's older sister Elizabeth Trump Grau.
Trapt (@TRAPTOFFICIAL)	American rock band	8 December 2020	Permanent	The official Trapt Twitter account and Chris Taylor Brown's personal account were both suspended after Brown, who operated both accounts, wrote a series of tweets defending statutory rape.
Chris Taylor Brown (@RealCTBTrapt)	Trapt lead vocalist	8 December 2020	Permanent	The official Trapt Twitter account and Chris Taylor Brown's personal account were both suspended after Brown, who operated both accounts, wrote a series of tweets defending statutory rape.
@real_bobcostas	Bob Costas imposter	9 December 2020	Permanent	Impersonating Bob Costas after a complaint to Twitter from Costas' son Keith Michael Kirby Costas.

=== 2021 ===
Individual/account	Description	Date	Duration	Reason for suspension
Dan Bongino (@dbongino)	American conservative political commentator	7 January 2021	Temporary	Violating Twitter's Civic Integrity policy.
L. Lin Wood (@LLinWood)	American pro-Trump lawyer and conspiracy theorist	7 January 2021	Permanent; later reinstated	Violating Twitter's rules against inciting violence and ban evasion using a second account (@FightBackLaw), which was also suspended.
Jake Angeli (@USAwolfpack)	American QAnon conspiracy theorist and far-right activist	7 January 2021	Permanent	Related to being a figurehead in the January 6 US Capitol attack.
Donald Trump (@realDonaldTrump)	President of the United States	8 January 2021	Permanent; later reinstated	On 7 January, Trump's personal account (@realDonaldTrump) was suspended for 12 hours after Twitter removed three of his tweets. This was elevated to a permanent suspension due to repeated and severe violations of Twitter's Civic Integrity policy, following his supporters' storming of the U.S. Capitol. After his suspension, Trump used the official account of the U.S. President (@POTUS); Twitter deleted Trump's new tweets written after the suspension and threatened to suspend accounts used by him for "ban evasion". Twitter also suspended the Trump presidential campaign's account (@TeamTrump) after it reposted the deleted tweets from @POTUS. Both accounts were later reinstated on 19 November 2022.
Team Trump (@TeamTrump)	Donald Trump presidential campaign	8 January 2021	Permanent; later reinstated	
Ben Garrison (@GrrrGraphics)	American alt-right political cartoonist	8 January 2021	Permanent (original account)	Posting a cartoon endorsing the storming of the US Capitol. Part of a larger banwave on accounts expressing similar sentiments. He later created a new account (@CartoonsBen) which is also suspended.
Gary Coby (@GaryCoby)	Digital Director for Trump's 2020 presidential campaign	8 January 2021	Permanent; later reinstated	Attempted to help President Trump evade Twitter bans by using his account. Coby changed the name and picture of his account to those of President Trump.
Michael Flynn (@GenFlynn)	Retired US Army lieutenant general and former National Security Advisor under Donald Trump	8 January 2021	Permanent; later reinstated	Violating Twitter's policy on "Coordinated Harmful Activity" in relation to sharing QAnon content.
Jim Watkins (@isitwetyet)	Operators of 8kun	8 January 2021	Permanent	Violating Twitter's policy on "Coordinated Harmful Activity" in relation to sharing QAnon content.
Ron Watkins (@CodeMonkeyZ)	Operators of 8kun	8 January 2021	Permanent; later reinstated	Violating Twitter's policy on "Coordinated Harmful Activity" in relation to sharing QAnon content.
Patrick Byrne (@PatrickByrne)	CEO Of Overstock.com, Pro Trump activist	8 January 2021	Permanent; later reinstated	Violating Twitter's policy on "Coordinated Harmful Activity" in relation to sharing QAnon content.
Sidney Powell (@SidneyPowell1)	American pro-Trump lawyer and conspiracy theorist	8 January 2021	Permanent; later reinstated	Violating Twitter's policy on "Coordinated Harmful Activity" in relation to sharing QAnon content.
Sci-Hub (@sci_hub)	Kazakhstani shadow library of research papers	8 January 2021	Permanent	Violating Twitter's counterfeiting policy.
Ali Alexander (@ali)	American far-right activist and organizer of Stop the Steal campaign	10 January 2021	Permanent	Was re-banned on 25 January 2023, after his account was re-instated earlier in the month.
Lou Barletta (@LouBarletta_PA)	Former US Representative for Pennsylvania's 11th congressional district	10 January 2021	Permanent (personal account); later reinstated	Suspended "in error for perceived violations of [Twitter's] impersonation policy". The account was restored the following day.
Chris Goss (@mastersreality)	Lead singer of Masters of Reality	11 January 2021	Permanent	Unknown.
Approximately 70,000 QAnon-related accounts		11 January 2021	Permanent	
Marjorie Taylor Greene (@mtgreenee)	US Congresswoman representing Georgia's 14th congressional district	17 January 2021	Temporary	Suspended for 12 hours for spreading misinformation about voter fraud in the 2020 US election.
Chinese Embassy in US (@ChineseEmbinUS)	Chinese government agency	20 January 2021	Temporary	The embassy's Twitter account was suspended after it issued a Tweet defending the Chinese government's actions in Xinjiang province. The Chinese government has carried out policies of mass internment, intensive surveillance, "re-education", destruction of cultural and religious sites, forced labor, forced abortion, and forced sterilization, as part of a campaign of cultural genocide targeting Uyghurs. The embassy's Tweet—claiming that Uyghur women had been "emancipated" from extremism and were "no longer baby-making machines"—was deleted, and the account was suspended for violating Twitter's policy prohibiting "dehumanization of a group of people based on their religion, caste, age, disability, serious disease, national origin, race, or ethnicity".
Kangana Ranaut (@KanganaTeam)	Indian actress and supporter of the Bharatiya Janata Party and Narendra Modi	20 January 2021	Temporary	For a now-deleted tweet on the makers of Tandav, in which the actress had said that it was "time to take their heads off". She had posted the comment in response to the Ministry of Information and Broadcasting asking the makers of the series to explain allegations of insult to Hindu gods in some scenes.
Tokyo Organising Committee of the Olympic and Paralympic Games (@Tokyo2020jp)	Official Tokyo 2020 Olympic Games Organization	24 January 2021	Temporary	The account's owner's date of birth was mistakenly set to 24 January 2014, the date the committee was created, causing the account to be automatically banned for not meeting the minimum age requirement of Twitter.
Mike Lindell (@realMikeLindell)	CEO of My Pillow, conservative political activist, and conspiracy theorist	25 January 2021	Permanent; later reinstated	Repeated violations of Twitter's Civic Integrity policy. Lindell used his Twitter account to promote disinformation about the 2020 presidential election. The account was later reinstated on 16 December 2022.
Yevgeny Prigozhin (@evgenyprigozhin)	Russian businessman	27 January 2021	Permanent	Violating Twitter's guidelines.
My Pillow (@mypillowusa)	American pillow manufacturing company	1 February 2021	Permanent; later reinstated	Violating Twitter's policy on ban evasion. After his personal account was banned for promoting disinformation, My Pillow CEO Mike Lindell used the company's Twitter account to post: "Jack Dorsey is trying to cancel me (Mike Lindell) out!"
Shiva Ayyadurai (@va_shiva)	Indian-American engineer, politician, and conspiracy theorist	2 February 2021	Permanent; later reinstated	Violating Twitter's Civic Integrity policy by promoting disinformation about US elections and the COVID-19 pandemic. The account was later reinstated on 16 December 2022.
Jim Hoft (@gatewaypundit)	Founder and editor of far-right fake news website The Gateway Pundit	6 February 2021	Permanent; later reinstated	Repeated violations of Twitter's Civic Integrity policy by promoting disinformation about the 2020 U.S. presidential election. The account was later reinstated on 16 December 2022.
Wayne Allyn Root (@realwayneroot)	American far-right radio host, author, activist, conservative political commentator, and conspiracy theorist	6 February 2021	Permanent; later reinstated	Violating Twitter's Civic Integrity policy. The account was later reinstated on 16 December 2022.
Project Veritas (@Project_Veritas)	American far-right activist group	11 February 2021	Permanent; later reinstated	Repeated violations of Twitter's policy against publishing private information. The account was later reinstated on 20 November 2022.
Music Box Theatre (@musicboxtheatre)	Movie theater in Chicago, Illinois	17 February 2021	Temporary	Violating the Digital Millennium Copyright Act by using the song "Take My Breath Away" in a trailer of coming attractions.
Roughly two dozen Russia- and Iran-affiliated troll accounts		25 February 2021	Permanent	Attempting to "manipulate the platform" by amplifying messages from pro-independence critics of SNP leader Nicola Sturgeon.
The Exposé (@DailyExposeUK)	British conspiracist website	March 2021	Permanent	Following the suspension of its main account, the website created several alt accounts to get around its ban.
Many Twitter accounts who posted the word "Memphis"		14 March 2021	Temporary	Technical issues, possibly caused by an internal misconfiguration intended to prevent sharing of a private address.
Marjorie Taylor Greene (@mtgreenee)	US Congresswoman representing Georgia's 14th congressional district	19 March 2021	Temporary	Suspended due to an automated mechanism error; reversed the same day.
Lee Hurst (@LeeHurstComic)	English comedian	20 March 2021	Temporary	Making a sexual joke about teenage climate activist Greta Thunberg.
Fake accounts posing as Amazon fulfillment center workers to spread pro-Amazon and anti-union messages		30 March 2021	Permanent	Violating Twitter's impersonation policy.
Jason Whitlock (@WhitlockJason)	American sports journalist	9 April 2021	Temporary	Violating Twitter's policy against posting private information. Whitlock had posted an article about co-founder of Black Lives Matter Patrisse Cullors' purchase of a $1.4 million home.
James O'Keefe (@JamesOKeefeIII)	American right-wing political activist and founder of Project Veritas	15 April 2021	Permanent; later reinstated	Twitter stated that O'Keefe operated fake accounts in violation of Twitter's rules against platform manipulation and spam. O'Keefe responded to the ban by threatening to sue Twitter for defamation. The account was later reinstated on 16 December 2022.
Ken Glueck (@KenGlueck)	Executive vice president at Oracle	28 April 2021	Temporary	Violating Twitter's policy against posting private information. Writer Mara Hvistendahl published an article in The Intercept alleging that Oracle was marketing its data analytics software to police and security contractors in China. Glueck issued a rebuttal to the piece on Oracle's website, asking readers with "any information about Mara or her reporting" to contact him at his personal ProtonMail email address. Hvistendahl tweeted a screenshot of this sentence in Glueck's rebuttal, including Glueck's email address. Glueck then tweeted Hvistendahl's professional email address and Signal phone number, which were published in her original article, as a way to "return the favor". Twitter suspended Glueck's account for 12 hours; Hvistendahl's account was not suspended. Glueck's request for information on Hvistendahl was later removed from his rebuttal.
Kangana Ranaut (@KanganaTeam)	Indian actress and supporter of the Bharatiya Janata Party and Narendra Modi	4 May 2021	Permanent	For inciting hate and violence with a tweet demanding President's rule in West Bengal in response to alleged post-poll violence two days after election results were announced. Ranaut wrote, "This is horrible… we need super gundai to kill gundai… she is like an unleashed monster, to tame her Modi ji please show your Virat roop from early 2000's…#PresidentRuleInBengal [sic]".
The Desk of Donald J. Trump (@DJTDesk)	Account reposting content from Donald Trump's website	5 May 2021	Permanent	Violating Twitter's policy on ban evasion. The @DJTDesk account was sharing short, Twitter-like blog posts from the website of former U.S. president Donald Trump, whose Twitter account @realDonaldTrump had previously been suspended. In a statement, Twitter said that it would "take enforcement action on accounts whose apparent intent is to replace or promote content affiliated with a suspended account". Trump spokesman Jason Miller denied that the account was set up by Trump or any of his affiliates.
Karoline Leavitt (@kc_leavitt)	Communications director for US Rep. Elise Stefanik	6 May 2021	Temporary	Suspended "in error", according to Twitter, and restored the same day.
Nine accounts linked to Irish journalist and columnist Eoghan Harris, including @barbarapym2		6 May 2021	Permanent	Violating Twitter's policy against platform manipulation. Harris had been operating an anonymous sock puppet account on Twitter under the name "Barbara J Pym". The account regularly posted incendiary tweets about Irish politics and had sent harassing messages to journalist Aoife Moore. Eight additional Twitter accounts with suspected links to the @barbarapym2 account were also later suspended. The Sunday Independent newspaper fired Harris from his job as a columnist; editor Alan English claimed that many of the tweets were "far beyond what I would describe as fair and reasonable comment". Harris claimed that he was only one of several people operating the @barbarapym2 account, and denied operating the other suspended accounts.
Official account of the Lieutenant Governor of Jammu and Kashmir (@OfficeOfLGJandK)		10 May 2021	Temporary	Reportedly due to a "technical error"; restored the same day.
Francisco José Contreras (@fjconpe)	Deputy of Spain's Vox political party	11 May 2021	Temporary	Violating Twitter's hateful conduct policy, resulting in a 12-hour suspension. In response to an article about a trans man giving birth, Contreras had posted: "A man cannot get pregnant. A man has no womb or eggs".
Muhammadu Buhari (@MBuhari)	President of Nigeria	2 June 2021	Temporary	Suspended for 12 hours for posting a tweet invoking the violence of the Nigerian Civil War in his threats to the separatist group Indigenous People of Biafra, which users claimed was inciting violence against the Igbo people. The tweet itself was also deleted. The text was: "Many of those misbehaving today are too young to be aware of the destruction and loss of lives that occurred during the Biafra War. Those of us in the fields for 30 months, who went through the war, will treat them in the language they understand".
Naomi Wolf (@naomirwolf)	American feminist writer and anti-vaccination conspiracy theorist	4 June 2021	Permanent; later reinstated	Spreading misinformation about COVID-19 vaccines. The account was later reinstated on 16 December 2022.
Rebekah Jones (@GeoRebekah)	American geographer and alleged whistleblower	7 June 2021	Permanent; later reinstated	"Platform manipulation and spam", caused by her repeatedly retweeting a Miami Herald article about her tenure with the Florida Department of Health. The account was later reinstated on 16 December 2022.
The Chaser (@chaser)	Australian comedy group and satirical news publication	11 June 2021	Temporary	Suspended for an hour for impersonating Pope Francis, J. K. Rowling, Prime Minister of Australia Scott Morrison and Coca-Cola, after regaining their verification they lost during their previous suspension.
Dave Portnoy (@stoolpresidente)	Founder of sports and pop culture blog Barstool Sports	18 June 2021	Temporary	Unknown.
Lee Hurst (@LeeHurstComic)	English comedian	30 June 2021	Temporary	Encouraging the physical assault of England's Chief Medical Officer Chris Whitty.
Anne-Marie Brady (@Anne_MarieBrady)	Chinese politics Professor at the University of Canterbury	1 July 2021	Temporary	Account locked for posting two tweets critical of Xi Jinping. Account later restored on 5 July.
Nick Fuentes (@NickJFuentes)	American white nationalist and far-right political commentator	9 July 2021	Permanent; later reinstated	Temporarily suspended in April 2021. Permanently suspended in July 2021 for "repeated violations" of Twitter rules. The suspension happened the day after the Anti-Defamation League published an article titled "Nicholas J. Fuentes: Five Things to Know". Fuentes' account was re-banned on 25 January 2023 after it had been reinstated the day before. Reinstated by Elon Musk in May 2024.
Marjorie Taylor Greene (@mtgreenee)	US Congresswoman representing Georgia's 14th congressional district	19 July 2021	Temporary	Suspended for 12 hours for sharing misinformation about COVID-19 and vaccines.
Nation of Islam (@OfficialNOI)	American religious and political organization	22 July 2021	Permanent	Spreading misinformation about COVID-19 vaccines.
@ArizonaAudit	Accounts calling for pro-Trump "audits" of the 2020 United States presidential election in several states, as well as promoting the Maricopa County audit.	27 July 2021	Permanent	Violating Twitter rules on platform manipulation and spam.
@Audit_PA	Accounts calling for pro-Trump "audits" of the 2020 United States presidential election in several states, as well as promoting the Maricopa County audit.	27 July 2021	Permanent	Violating Twitter rules on platform manipulation and spam.
@AuditGeorgia	Accounts calling for pro-Trump "audits" of the 2020 United States presidential election in several states, as well as promoting the Maricopa County audit.	27 July 2021	Permanent	Violating Twitter rules on platform manipulation and spam.
@AuditMichigan	Accounts calling for pro-Trump "audits" of the 2020 United States presidential election in several states, as well as promoting the Maricopa County audit.	27 July 2021	Permanent	Violating Twitter rules on platform manipulation and spam.
@AuditNevada	Accounts calling for pro-Trump "audits" of the 2020 United States presidential election in several states, as well as promoting the Maricopa County audit.	27 July 2021	Permanent	Violating Twitter rules on platform manipulation and spam.
@AuditWarRoom	Accounts calling for pro-Trump "audits" of the 2020 United States presidential election in several states, as well as promoting the Maricopa County audit.	27 July 2021	Permanent	Violating Twitter rules on platform manipulation and spam.
@AuditWisconsin	Accounts calling for pro-Trump "audits" of the 2020 United States presidential election in several states, as well as promoting the Maricopa County audit.	27 July 2021	Permanent	Violating Twitter rules on platform manipulation and spam.
Anjem Choudary (@anjemchoudary_)	British Islamist hate preacher convicted under the United Kingdom's Terrorism Act 2000	28 July 2021	Permanent	Violating Twitter's rules on violent organizations and individuals. Choudary had been convicted on charges of supporting ISIL in 2016 and had been released from prison in 2018. His account was banned alongside his Facebook, Instagram, and LinkedIn accounts weeks after restrictions on his ability to use the internet were lifted.
Bronze Age Pervert (@bronzeagemantis)	Alt-right author	4 August 2021	Permanent; later reinstated	Unknown. The account was later reinstated on 6 December 2022.
Allie Beth Stuckey (@conservmillen)	American conservative commentator	5 August 2021	Temporary	Suspended for 12 hours for repeatedly calling New Zealand transgender weightlifter Laurel Hubbard a man.
@CormacMcCrthy	Cormac McCarthy imposter	9 August 2021	Permanent	Account created by California Democratic gubernatorial candidate Daniel Watts suspended for impersonating Cormac McCarthy.
Aubrey Huff (@aubrey_huff)	Former professional baseball player	10 August 2021	Permanent; later reinstated	Repeated violations of COVID-19 misleading information policy. The account was later reinstated on 16 December 2022.
Marjorie Taylor Greene (@mtgreenee)	US Congresswoman representing Georgia's 14th congressional district	10 August 2021	Temporary	Suspended for one week for sharing misinformation about COVID-19 and vaccines.
@BBCAfghanNews	Fake news accounts	17 August 2021	Permanent	Banned for propagating a fake story about a fictitious CNN journalist named "Bernie Gores", who they claimed was killed by the Taliban during the Fall of Kabul. None of the accounts were verified and, except for @CNNAfghan, this was their only tweet.
@CNNAfghan	Fake news accounts	17 August 2021	Permanent	Banned for propagating a fake story about a fictitious CNN journalist named "Bernie Gores", who they claimed was killed by the Taliban during the Fall of Kabul. None of the accounts were verified and, except for @CNNAfghan, this was their only tweet.
@MSNBCAfghan	Fake news accounts	17 August 2021	Permanent	Banned for propagating a fake story about a fictitious CNN journalist named "Bernie Gores", who they claimed was killed by the Taliban during the Fall of Kabul. None of the accounts were verified and, except for @CNNAfghan, this was their only tweet.
Jean Messiha (@jeanmessiha)	French politician	26 August 2021	Permanent	Banned for repeatedly violating Twitter's hateful conduct policy.
Alex Berenson (@alexberenson)	Writer	29 August 2021	Permanent; later reinstated	Banned for repeatedly violating Twitter's COVID-19 misinformation policy. The account was later reinstated on 26 August 2022.
Anonymous Germany (@AnonNewsDE)	Decentralised hacking group	13 September 2021	Permanent	Banned for 'disseminating hacked material, the policy on private information, and against the policy on platform manipulation and spam', following the hack of neo-Nazi conspiracy theorist Attila Hildmann.
Greg Locke (@pastorlocke)	Founder of Global Vision Bible Church	14 September 2021	Permanent; later reinstated	Banned for repeatedly violating Twitter's COVID-19 misinformation policy. The account was later reinstated on 16 December 2022.
Nicki Minaj (@nickiminaj)	Rapper	15 September 2021	Temporary	Minaj claimed to be suspended for spreading misinformation about COVID-19, however, this claim was disputed by Twitter.
André Ventura (@AndreCVentura)	Portuguese politician and founder of far-right party Chega	28 September 2021	Temporary	Unknown.
Jim Banks (@RepJimBanks)	American politician serving as U.S. Representative for Indiana's 3rd congressional district	23 October 2021	Temporary	Temporarily suspended for misgendering assistant secretary of health Rachel Levine.
Emerald Robinson (@Emeraldrobinson)	American journalist, White House Correspondent for Newsmax TV	10 November 2021	Permanent; later reinstated	Banned for repeatedly violating Twitter's COVID-19 misinformation policy. The account was later reinstated on 16 December 2022.
@TrackerTrial	Account covering the sex trafficking trial of Ghislaine Maxwell	8 December 2021	Permanent	Banned for violating Twitter's rules against platform manipulation and spam.
Robert W. Malone (@RWMaloneMD)	American virologist and immunologist	29 December 2021	Permanent; later reinstated	Banned for repeatedly violating Twitter's COVID-19 misinformation policy. The account was later reinstated on 12 December 2022.

=== 2022 ===
Individual/account	Description	Date	Duration	Reason for suspension
Marjorie Taylor Greene (@mtgreenee)	Personal account of US Congresswoman representing Georgia's 14th congressional district	2 January 2022	Permanent; later reinstated	Permanently suspended after multiple violations of Twitter's COVID-19 misinformation policy throughout 2021. Her official congressional account (@RepMTG) was not suspended. Greene is the first sitting member of Congress to have her personal Twitter account permanently suspended. The account was reinstated 21 November 2022.
Politics for All (@PoliticsForAlI)	News aggregate account	4 January 2022	Permanent	Banned for violating Twitter's rules against platform manipulation and spam.
Matt Walsh (@MattWalshBlog)	American right-wing political commentator and author	8 January 2022	Temporary	Temporarily suspended for making transphobic comments. His account was restored once the offensive Tweets in question were deleted.
Luciano Hang (@lucianohangbr)	Brazilian businessman, co-founder and owner of Havan department stores	12 January 2022	Permanent; later reinstated	Suspended due to a court order issued by the Supreme Federal Court in an attempt to combat fake news in Brazil. Hang later stated his account was banned due to sharing a video denouncing the vaccination of children. His account was reinstated 72 hours later.
Ali Khamenei (@KhameneiSite)	One of many official Twitter accounts belonging to the Supreme Leader of Iran	15 January 2022	Permanent	Permanently suspended after releasing an animation targeting former US President Donald Trump in revenge for the assassination of Qasem Soleimani in 2020. Several other accounts belonging to Khamenei remain active on the network.
300 accounts promoting the Philippines' presidential front-runner Bongbong Marcos		21 January 2022	Permanent	Banned for violating the company's policies on platform manipulation and spam.
@wordlinator	Bot account automatically responding to Tweets regarding Wordle games	26 January 2022	Permanent	Suspended for "violating the Twitter rules and the automation rules around sending unsolicited mentions".
@DefiantLs	Account highlighting hypocritical and contradictory tweets from public figures	15 February 2022	Temporary	Allegedly for circumventing a previous ban. The account's owner denies ever having been banned under any other account. The suspension was lifted the next day.
Numerous Open-source intelligence accounts		22–23 February 2022	Temporary	Suspended or locked out for sharing images and videos showing Russian military movement into eastern Ukraine as part of the prelude to the Russian invasion of Ukraine. Some of the affected accounts allege it is part of a coordinated campaign to remove their content.
Grace Lavery (@graceelavery)	Associate professor at University of California, Berkeley	23 February 2022	Permanent	Suspended for tweeting "I hope the queen dies" after news that Queen Elizabeth II had tested positive for COVID-19.
CNN Ukraine (@CNNUKR)	Fake news account	25 February 2022	Permanent	Sharing fake news about death of journalist in Ukraine.
Randy Hillier (@randyhillier)	Member of the Ontario Provincial Parliament	8 March 2022	Permanent; later reinstated	Banned for repeatedly violating Twitter's COVID-19 misinformation policy. The account was later reinstated on 16 December 2022.
Samantha Markle (@TheMarkleSammy)	Older paternal half-sister of Meghan Markle, the Duchess of Sussex	14 March 2022	Permanent	Violating the rules against ban evasion.
The Babylon Bee (@TheBabylonBee)	News satire website	21 March 2022	Temporary	Account locked for hateful conduct after posting an attack on U.S. Health Assistant Secretary Rachel Levine, mocking her placement on USA Today's "Women of the Year" list. The Babylon Bee has refused to delete the Tweet in question. The account was reinstated on 18 November 2022.
Charlie Kirk (@charliekirk11)	Founder of Turning Point USA	22 March 2022	Temporary	Account locked for hateful conduct after posting a Tweet mocking U.S. Health Assistant Secretary Rachel Levine's placement on USA Today's "Women of the Year" list. After initially refusing to delete the Tweet in question, Kirk complied with the request and regained access to his account five weeks after his suspension.
Tucker Carlson (@tuckercarlson)	American television host and conservative political commentator	23 March 2022	Temporary	Account locked for hateful conduct after posting a Tweet mocking U.S. Health Assistant Secretary Rachel Levine's placement on USA Today's "Women of the Year" list. After initially refusing to delete the Tweet in question, Carlson complied with the request and regained access to his account a month later.
Juanita Broaddrick (@atensnut)	Bill Clinton rape accuser	11 April 2022	Permanent; later reinstated	Violating the policy on spreading misleading and potentially harmful information related to COVID-19.
Pennsylvania House of Representatives Republican Caucus (@PAHouseGOP)	Caucus of the Pennsylvania Legislature	13 April 2022	Temporary	Unknown. Suspension was lifted hours later.
Libs of TikTok (@libsoftiktok)	Account mocking liberal posts on TikTok and other social media sites	13 April 2022	Temporary	Temporarily suspended for 12 hours due to "hateful conduct".
Geert Wilders (@geertwilderspvv)	Dutch far-right politician and leader of the Party for Freedom.	25 April 2022	Temporary	Temporarily suspended for violating Twitter's "hateful conduct" policy after mentioning Pakistani Prime Minister Shehbaz Sharif in a Tweet which criticised Islam.
Roger Stone (@RogerStoneUSA)	American conservative political consultant and lobbyist	28 April 2022	Permanent	Permanently suspended for evading an October 2017 Twitter ban.
Mike Lindell (@MikeJLindell)	CEO of MyPillow	1 May 2022	Permanent	Permanently suspended for evading a January 2021 Twitter ban.
Donald J Trump's Truth Social Posts (@PresTrumpTS)	Account posting Donald Trump posts from his Truth Social account.	17 May 2022	Permanent	Permanently suspended for violating the ban evasion policy since his role in the 2021 United States Capitol attack.
Over 300 suspected bot accounts in Ireland		17 May 2022	Permanent	Permanently suspended for mass-retweeting a Tweet by Irish Minister for Health Stephen Donnelly and violating Twitter's spam policy after the Fianna Fáil and Department of Health requested the company launch an investigation into the accounts.
Laurence Fox (@lozzafox)	English actor and conservative political activist.	26 June 2022	Temporary	Temporarily suspended for changing his profile picture to a swastika made out of four LGBTQ flags.
At least 80 accounts related to Gurbaksh Chahal's BNN News Network		28 June 2022	Permanent	Permanently suspended for manipulating the company's policies on spam and platform manipulation.
Jordan Peterson (@jordanbpeterson)	Canadian clinical psychologist, YouTube personality and author.	29 June 2022	Temporary	Temporarily suspended for misgendering actor Elliot Page. Peterson later stated he refused to delete the Tweet in question. The account was restored in November of the same year after Elon Musk bought the company.
Dave Rubin (@RubinReport)	American conservative political commentator	5 July 2022	Temporary	Rubin claims to have been suspended by the platform for discussing Jordan Peterson's suspension after misgendering actor Elliot Page.
@RuthSentUs	American pro-abortion rights group	14 July 2022	Permanent	Permanently suspended for publishing a map containing the home addresses of six Supreme Court Justices, including Amy Coney Barrett and Brett Kavanaugh.
Tetsuya Yamagami (@333_hill)	Main defendant in Shinzo Abe's assassination case	19 July 2022	Permanent	Permanently suspended for unspecified violation of Twitter's corporate policies.
@GBNews_UK	Fake news account	26 July 2022	Permanent	Permanently suspended for posting a fake news article claiming that a lorry carrying £20,000 of oysters and champagne to Jacob Rees-Mogg's house was stuck in traffic.
James A. Lindsay (@ConceptualJames)	American mathematician, author and cultural critic	5 August 2022	Permanent; later reinstated	Permanently suspended for violating the platform's "hateful conduct" policy.
Luis Miguel (@LuisMiguelUS)	American political candidate	19 August 2022	Permanent	Permanently suspended after a tweet advocating shooting federal law enforcement agents.
Libs of TikTok (@libsoftiktok)	Account mocking liberal posts on TikTok and other social media sites	27 August 2022	Temporary	Temporarily suspended for violating the platform's "hateful conduct" policy.
@bjorkanism	Accounts operated by Bjorka, purportedly Polish hacker and hacktivist	11 September 2022	Permanent	Permanently suspended for violating Twitter's policies regarding distribution of hacked materials.
@bjorxanism	Accounts operated by Bjorka, purportedly Polish hacker and hacktivist	12 September 2022	Permanent	Permanently suspended for violating Twitter's ban evasion policy.
@bjorkanesian	Accounts operated by Bjorka, purportedly Polish hacker and hacktivist	13 September 2022	Permanent	Permanently suspended for violating Twitter's ban evasion policy.
@bjorkanism19	Accounts operated by Bjorka, purportedly Polish hacker and hacktivist	18 September 2022	Permanent	Permanently suspended for violating Twitter's ban evasion policy.
Libs of TikTok (@libsoftiktok)	Account mocking liberal posts on TikTok and other social media sites.	28 September 2022	Temporary	Temporarily suspended for seven days for violating the platform's 'hateful conduct' policy.
Peter A. McCullough (@P_McCulloughMD)	American Cardiologist and Epidemiologist	6 October 2022	Permanent; later reinstated	Unknown.
Kanye West (@kanyewest)	American rapper	8 October 2022	Temporary	Temporarily suspended after posting an antisemitic Tweet, declaring that he was going to go "death con 3" on Jewish people.
Kathy Griffin (@kathygriffin)	American comedian	6 November 2022	Permanent; later reinstated	Permanently suspended for impersonating Elon Musk. Her account was reinstated 13 days later.
h3h3Productions (@h3h3productions)	American YouTuber	6 November 2022	Permanent; later reinstated	Permanently suspended for impersonating Elon Musk. The account was reinstated on 21 December.
Amy Rose Brown (@arb)	Verified user	6 November 2022	Permanent	Impersonating Elon Musk.
Chris Kluwe (@chriswarcraft)	American former football player	6 November 2022	Permanent	Impersonating Elon Musk.
Jeph Jacques (@jephjacques)	American cartoonist and creator of Questionable Content	6 November 2022	Permanent	Impersonating Elon Musk.
Rich Sommer (@richsommer)	American actor	6 November 2022	Permanent	Impersonating Elon Musk.
@EliLillyandCo	Account impersonating Eli Lilly and Company	10 November 2022	Permanent (impersonated account)	Banned after posting a tweet claiming the company was making insulin free, causing Eli Lilly to lose $15 billion in market capitalization. This, alongside similar impersonation incidents, caused Twitter to temporarily suspend its Twitter Blue program. On 1 May 2023, Eli Lilly's official Twitter account was changed from @LillyPad.
Elm Fork John Brown Gun Club (@EFJBGC)	Anti-fascist firearm group	22 November 2022	Permanent	"Hateful conduct" relating to separate tweets that criticized the U.S. Customs and Border Protection and advocated for LGBT firearm ownership following the Colorado Springs nightclub shooting.
Chad Loder (@chadloder)	American anti-fascist activist	23 November 2022	Permanent	Unknown. Reportedly banned on order from Elon Musk.
CrimethInc (@crimethinc)	Anarchist collective	25 November 2022	Permanent	Banned on request by Andy Ngo to Elon Musk.
Edith Frost (@edithfrost)	American singer-songwriter	30 November 2022	Permanent	Impersonating Elon Musk.
Kanye West (@kanyewest)	American rapper	1 December 2022	Permanent, later reinstated	Posting a picture of a Raëlism symbol resembling a swastika inside a Star of David and praising Adolf Hitler during his appearance on InfoWars earlier in the day. Account was reinstated on 29 June 2023; but the account is not eligible for monetization.
@ElonJet	Account that tracked the private flights of Elon Musk.	14 December 2022	Permanent	Rule violations. Musk in a previous tweet said the ElonJet's account was a "direct personal safety risk", and the account's owner said it was shadow banned prior to its suspension. ElonJet was unsuspended for an hour before being banned again.
@ZuccJet	Account that tracked the private flights of Mark Zuckerberg.	14 December 2022	Permanent	Rule violations. Musk in a previous tweet said the ElonJet's account was a "direct personal safety risk", and the account's owner said it was shadow banned prior to its suspension. ElonJet was unsuspended for an hour before being banned again.
@JohnKerryJet	Account that tracked the private flights of John Kerry.	14 December 2022	Permanent	Rule violations. Musk in a previous tweet said the ElonJet's account was a "direct personal safety risk", and the account's owner said it was shadow banned prior to its suspension. ElonJet was unsuspended for an hour before being banned again.
@TrumpJets	Account that tracked the private flights of Donald Trump.	14 December 2022	Permanent	Rule violations. Musk in a previous tweet said the ElonJet's account was a "direct personal safety risk", and the account's owner said it was shadow banned prior to its suspension. ElonJet was unsuspended for an hour before being banned again.
Jack Sweeney (@JxckSweeney)	Personal account of the owner of the above accounts.	14 December 2022	Permanent	Rule violations. Musk in a previous tweet said the ElonJet's account was a "direct personal safety risk", and the account's owner said it was shadow banned prior to its suspension. ElonJet was unsuspended for an hour before being banned again.
Mastodon (@joinmastodon)	Official account of the open source Mastodon social network	15 December 2022	Temporary	Unknown. Twitter users were also blocked from sharing links to Mastodon. Reinstated on 17 December.
Aaron Rupar (@atrupar)	Freelance journalist	15 December 2022	Temporary	Initially suspended for seven days for "doxxing"; All accounts had a history of reporting on Musk or his companies. The accounts were reinstated on 17 December.
Drew Harwell (@drewharwell)	Reporter for The Washington Post	15 December 2022	Temporary	Initially suspended for seven days for "doxxing"; All accounts had a history of reporting on Musk or his companies. The accounts were reinstated on 17 December.
Donie O'Sullivan (@donie)	Reporter for CNN	15 December 2022	Temporary	Initially suspended for seven days for "doxxing"; All accounts had a history of reporting on Musk or his companies. The accounts were reinstated on 17 December.
Matt Binder (@mattbinder)	Reporter for Mashable	15 December 2022	Temporary	Initially suspended for seven days for "doxxing"; All accounts had a history of reporting on Musk or his companies. The accounts were reinstated on 17 December.
Micah Lee (@micahflee)	Reporter for The Intercept	15 December 2022	Temporary	Initially suspended for seven days for "doxxing"; All accounts had a history of reporting on Musk or his companies. The accounts were reinstated on 17 December.
Ryan Mac (@rmac18)	Reporter for The New York Times	15 December 2022	Temporary	Initially suspended for seven days for "doxxing"; All accounts had a history of reporting on Musk or his companies. The accounts were reinstated on 17 December.
Keith Olbermann (@keitholbermann)	American political commentator	15 December 2022	Temporary	Initially suspended for seven days for "doxxing"; All accounts had a history of reporting on Musk or his companies. The accounts were reinstated on 17 December.
Steven L. Herman (@W7VOA)	Chief national correspondent for Voice of America	15 December 2022	Temporary	Initially suspended for seven days for "doxxing"; All accounts had a history of reporting on Musk or his companies. The accounts were reinstated on 17 December.
Linette Lopez (@lopezlinette)	Reporter for Business Insider	16 December 2022	Temporary	Unknown. Lopez had previously written investigative reports on Tesla.
Susan Li (@SusanLiTV)	Journalist for Fox Business	16 December 2022	Permanent	Suspended for posting a link to a flight tracking website when discussing how private flights are tracked with public data.
Taylor Lorenz (@TaylorLorenz)	Journalist for The Washington Post	17 December 2022	Temporary	Suspended for "prior doxxing". Lorenz claimed she was working on a story with Drew Harwell involving Musk, and got suspended after attempting to reach him for comment without any explanation. The following day Twitter denied her appeal and permanently suspended Lorenz. Hours later her account was reinstated.
Paul Graham (@PaulG)	Computer scientist and venture capitalist	18 December 2022	Temporary	Tweeting "This is the last straw. I give up. You can find a link to my new Mastodon profile on my site" after Twitter updated its policies to ban the promotion of other social media sites.

=== 2023 ===
Individual/account	Description	Date	Duration	Reason for suspension
Michael Russell (@feorlean)	President of the Scottish National Party	17 January 2023	Temporary	Violation of Twitter rules.
Steve Daines (@SteveDaines)	U.S. Senator from Montana	7 February 2023	Temporary	Violating rule against "graphic violence or adult content in profile images" after he changed his profile picture to an image of him and his wife hunting.
Mike Lee (@BasedMikeLee)	Personal account of U.S. Senator from Utah	1 March 2023	Temporary	Incorrectly flagged as impersonation.
Globe Gazette (@globegazette)	American newspaper based in Mason City, Iowa	16 March 2023	Temporary	Unknown. Account restored a day later following appeals by the newspaper's editor, U.S. Senator Chuck Grassley, and U.S. Representative Ashley Hinson.
Sean Plunket (@SeanPlunket)	New Zealand broadcaster	3 April 2023	Permanent; later reinstated	Hateful conduct
Dell Cameron (@dellcam)	Senior reporter for Wired	18 April 2023	Permanent	Banned after interviewing the person who hacked Matt Walsh's social media accounts.
@BlockTheBlue	Account encouraging users to block accounts subscribed to Twitter Blue	21 April 2023	Permanent	Unknown.
Dominick "Lucre" McGee (@dom_lucre)	Right-wing influencer	26 July 2023	Temporary	Violating X's child pornography by posting an image of a victim of Peter Scully. Due to outrage from McGee's followers, his account was later unsuspended.
@JUNlPER	Shitposter	6 October 2023	Permanent	Unclear; presumably accusing Elon Musk of pedophilia.
@UNSTABLEPOSTING	Shitposter	6 October 2023	Permanent	Unclear; presumably accusing Elon Musk of pedophilia.
@junegoblinmode	Shitposter	8 October 2023	Permanent	Ban evasion.
Bob Lonsberry	Conservative talk radio personality	October 2023	Permanent	An unspecified violation of platform rules.
@EyeonPalestine	Account detailing life in Palestine	25 October 2023	Permanent	Unknown. Happened on the same date that its Instagram account was locked allegedly due to security issues.
Robert Card @RobertC20041800	Account used by the perpetrator of the 2023 Lewiston shootings	26 October 2023	Permanent	Unknown

=== 2024 ===
Individual/account	Description	Date	Duration	Reason for suspension
Yulia Navalnaya	Russian opposition activist and widow of Alexei Navalny.	20 February 2024	Temporary	Unknown
Alejandra Caraballo	Transgender attorney and activist	19 March 2024	Permanent; later reinstated	Posting the name of a webcomic artist who posts under the pseudonym of StoneToss.
Mandla Mandela	Activist and grandson of Nelson Mandela	26 April 2024	Permanent	Unknown
Ken Klippenstein	American journalist	26 September 2024	Temporary	Publication of a Donald Trump 2024 presidential campaign dossier into JD Vance.

=== 2025 ===
Individual/account	Description	Date	Duration	Reason for suspension
Thomas Sewell	Australian political activists	5 February 2025	Indefinite	Banned as part of a platform-wide crackdown on "neo-Nazi and extremist" content.
Blair Cottrell	Australian political activists	5 February 2025	Indefinite	Banned as part of a platform-wide crackdown on "neo-Nazi and extremist" content.
Jacob Hersant	Australian political activists	5 February 2025	Indefinite	Banned as part of a platform-wide crackdown on "neo-Nazi and extremist" content.
Grok (@grok)	Official account for xAI's generative artificial intelligence chatbot	11 August 2025	~20 minutes	Briefly suspended after automated content filters flagged AI-generated responses regarding geopolitical conflicts as violations of the platform's hateful conduct policies.

=== 2026 ===
Individual/account	Description	Date	Duration	Reason for suspension
Twitter (@twitter)	Former official handle of the social media platform	11 January 2026	Indefinite	Deactivated and placed under a standard "account suspended" notice as part of X Corp.'s transition away from the original Twitter branding.

== See also ==
- Censorship of Twitter
- December 2022 Twitter suspensions
- Deplatforming
- Internet censorship
- Shadow banning
- Twitter Files
