= December 2022 Twitter suspensions =

Suspension of journalists from Twitter

Twitter suspension of journalists
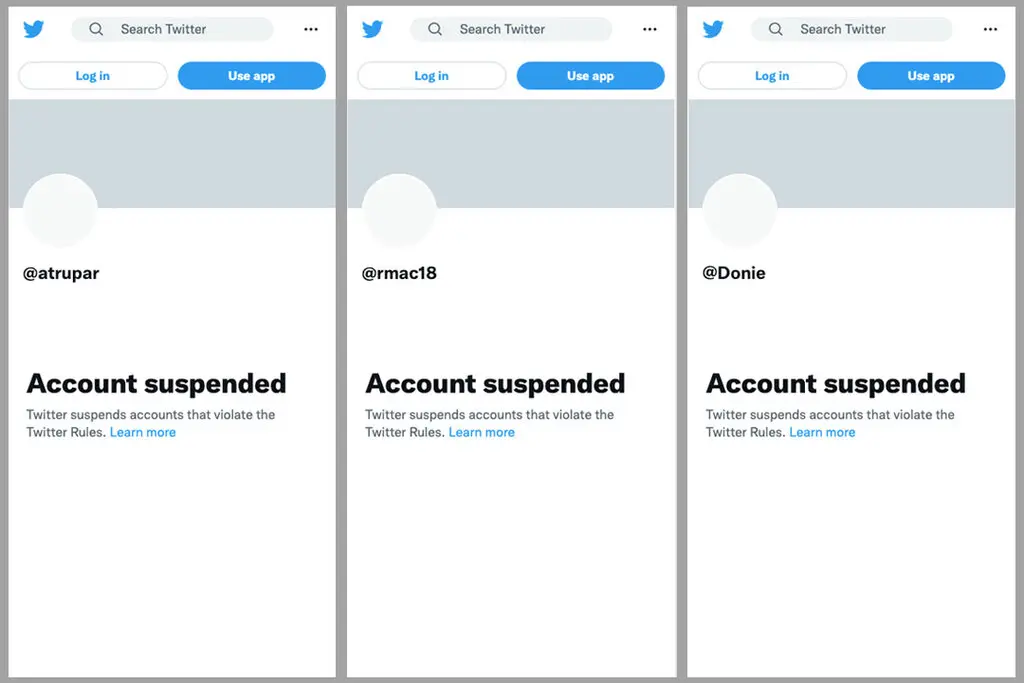
- Three journalists suspended on Twitter
- Date: December 15, 2022; 3 years ago
- Location: Twitter
- Also known as: Twitter journalist purge
- Type: Account suspensions
- Theme: Censorship by Twitter
- Cause: Twitter Safety policy change
- Motive: Doxxing response
- Target: Journalists
- Perpetrator: Elon Musk
- Organised by: Elon Musk and Twitter
- Outcome: ElonJet and 10 journalists suspended including Steven L. Herman, Donie O'Sullivan, Linette Lopez and Keith Olbermann

On December 15, 2022, Twitter suspended the accounts of ten journalists who had covered the company and its owner, Elon Musk. They included reporters Keith Olbermann, Steven L. Herman, and Donie O'Sullivan, as well as journalists from The New York Times, The Washington Post, CNN, and The Intercept. Musk cited an incident between "a crazy stalker" and a car with his child as a justification for the suspensions. Posters on behalf of the owners of the accounts said that the suspensions were permanent. On December 16, 2022, Musk said that account access would be restricted for only seven days, and on December 17, some accounts were reportedly restored, with Musk citing Twitter community polls as the reason for the reversal.

Twitter officials initially offered no explanation for their decision. They later said it was due to violations of a new rule, created one day before the bans took place. The policy change prohibited accounts from sharing real-time flight information of private jets. The bans were allegedly in response to the @ElonJet account, which tracks Musk's private jet. The account and other similar accounts were suspended from Twitter on December 14, 2022, but continued operating on Facebook, Mastodon, and other social media platforms.

Several of the suspended journalists said they had not violated the rule, and while some had included links to @ElonJet in their articles or reported about the account, it was already suspended at the time of media reports. The Twitter account of Mastodon, a rival social-media platform, was also suspended on December 15 after linking to @ElonJet on a Mastodon server. Users were unable to share Mastodon links in their tweets and they were labeled as "potentially harmful" and containing "malware".

The suspensions drew criticism from various organizations and individuals. Some said the actions undermined Musk's repeated claims of supporting free speech on Twitter, while others said Musk had a history of doxxing and harassing people in similar ways, which he was now criticizing. The suspensions were condemned by representatives of several countries and organizations, including the United Nations and the European Union. EU officials said the actions may have violated the Digital Services Act, which could result in sanctions or even a ban of Twitter in Europe. The Government Accountability Project filed a complaint to the United States Congress regarding the suspensions.

== Background ==
Avatar of Elon Musk

Elon Musk
(@elonmusk)
tweeted:

My commitment to free speech extends even to not banning the account following my plane, even though that is a direct personal safety risk

November 7, 2022

Business magnate Elon Musk purchased the social media company Twitter for $44 billion on October 27, 2022, after a lengthy process that began when Musk made the initial purchase offer on April 14, 2022, then later rescinded the deal after it was accepted. The company sued Musk to compel him to honor his offer, and although Musk had announced his intent to fight in court, he reversed course. Upon acquiring Twitter, Musk fired several top executives, fired half of the workforce, and proposed changes to the platform, such as removal of spambots and open-sourcing Twitter's algorithms.

One of Musk's primary pledges upon acquiring Twitter was promoting free speech, something he has been criticized for failing to do since. He was previously concerned that Twitter was censoring conservative viewpoints, and said the platform would allow all legal speech. He has described himself as a "free speech absolutist". Acting on this conviction, Musk then restored several accounts that were permanently suspended before his purchase, including Donald Trump, whose account @realDonaldTrump had been suspended for tweets that allegedly helped incite the January 6 United States Capitol attack.

Avatar of Safety

Safety
(@Safety)
tweeted:

We've updated our Private Information policy to prohibit sharing someone else's live location in most cases. Here's what changed and why. 🧵

December 14, 2022

Before the Twitter account suspensions of December 14 and 15, 2022, Musk shared concerns about the accounts that tracked his jet. Specifically, he criticized the Internet bot account @ElonJet, which used publicly available flight data to track trips taken by Musk's private plane. The account, which was started by a college student named Jack Sweeney, had more than 500,000 followers as of December 2022. Sweeney also ran a version of the bot on the social networking platform Instagram. In January 2022, before Musk purchased Twitter, he privately offered Sweeney $5,000 to delete the account. Sweeney rejected the offer and asked for $50,000, to which Musk did not agree. After Musk purchased Twitter, Sweeney cited screenshots provided by a Twitter employee indicating the company limited the reach of the @ElonJet account, though he said those restrictions were later removed. In November 2022, Musk publicly said he would not ban @ElonJet, despite claiming the account "is a direct personal safety risk", because of his "commitment to free speech".

== Account suspensions ==
=== Twitter policy changes ===
Avatar of Elon Musk

Elon Musk
(@elonmusk)
tweeted:

Any account doxxing real-time location info of anyone will be suspended, as it is a physical safety violation. This includes posting links to sites with real-time location info. Posting locations someone traveled to on a slightly delayed basis isn’t a safety problem, so is ok.

December 15, 2022

On December 14, 2022, the social media platform created the new rule that was used to ban accounts publishing the real-time location and movement of private jets. Specifically, Twitter's private information and media policy was modified to include a clause prohibiting the sharing of live location data: "we will remove any tweets or accounts that share someone's live location". The word "jet" does not appear anywhere in the Twitter policy, but according to CNN reporter Donie O'Sullivan the rules "appeared to be designed specifically to justify the removal of the jet-tracking account".

Twitter's official @TwitterSafety account issued messages about the policy change, writing that they would remove tweets that posted live location information and suspend accounts dedicated to doing so. They clarified that users were allowed to share their own live location and the "historical" location of someone else, but "not same-day" information. Musk himself also tweeted about the new policy on December 14.

=== Suspension of flight-tracking accounts ===
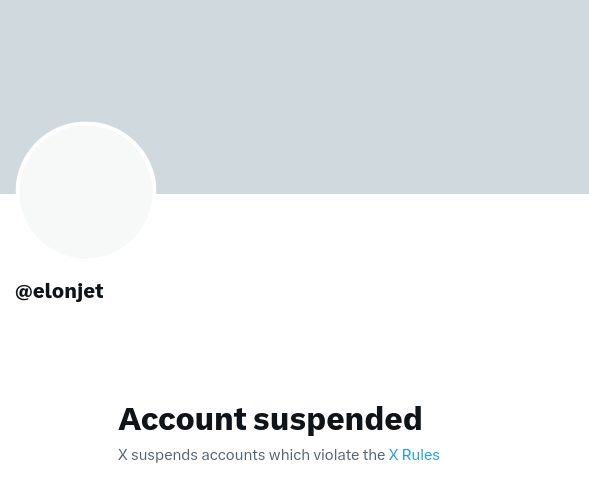
@elonjet account suspended on X

The day the new rule was implemented, Twitter suspended the @ElonJet account, as well as the personal account of its creator (@JxckSweeney). Other similar accounts were also suspended, including some that followed the planes of other billionaires such as Bill Gates and Jeff Bezos. Some of these had also been operated by Sweeney, who defended himself, telling NBC News: "All I'm doing is taking their data and putting it on Twitter. There's nothing I'm doing wrong, and I didn't mean any harm."

On December 14, Musk said that a car carrying one of his children had been followed by a "crazy stalker (thinking it was me), who later blocked car from moving & climbed onto hood". In the same tweet, Musk said he would take legal action against Sweeney and "organizations who supported harm to my family" as a result of the alleged altercation. Musk publicly posted video footage of a man who he said was the person involved in the incident. The man in the video was also using his smartphone to record whoever was filming him, and Musk included the man's license plate in the video clip, asking his followers if anyone recognized him. The South Pasadena police were called to the scene, but no report had been filed. They found no link to suggest the ElonJet account had contributed to the confrontation. The department believes the suspect is a member of Musk's security team.

=== Suspension of journalist accounts ===
On December 15, 2022, the social networking service Twitter suspended the accounts of several journalists who routinely reported on the platform and Musk, including:

Journalist	Twitter Handle	Organization
Matt Binder	@mattbinder	Mashable
Drew Harwell	@drewharwell	The Washington Post
Steven L. Herman	@W7VOA	Voice of America
Micah Lee	@micahflee	The Intercept
Ryan Mac	@rmac18	The New York Times
Donie O'Sullivan	@donie	CNN
Linette Lopez	@lopezlinette	Business Insider
Keith Olbermann	@keitholbermann	Countdown with Keith Olbermann
Aaron Rupar	@atrupar	freelance
Tony Webster	@webster	freelance

Additionally, the Twitter account for Mastodon (@joinmastodon), a competitor of Twitter, was suspended on December 15, and users were unable to post any links to some of the most popular Mastodon servers in their tweets. Twitter did not initially say why the Mastodon account was suspended or if specific rules had been broken, but earlier in the day, it linked to one of Sweeney's ElonJet accounts hosted on the Mastodon platform. Although Mastodon's account was suspended and its links were blocked, the term "Mastodon" was a trending topic after the changes. It was not initially clear if the ban would be permanent, but Musk later clarified that the suspension would last seven days. Other journalist accounts were also suspended after December 15. Susan Li (@SusanLiTV), a television journalist with Fox Business Network, was suspended on December 16 after posting a link to an aircraft tracking website in an attempt to demonstrate the ease with which Musk's jet could be tracked using public data. The account of Washington Post reporter Taylor Lorenz (@TaylorLorenz) was suspended on December 17 for "prior doxxing action", but was quickly restored.

Avatar of Elon Musk

Elon Musk
(@elonmusk)
tweeted:

Same doxxing rules apply to "journalists" as to everyone else

December 16, 2022

Avatar of Elon Musk

Elon Musk
(@elonmusk)
tweeted:

Criticizing me all day long is totally fine, but doxxing my real-time location and endangering my family is not

December 16, 2022

Avatar of Elon Musk

Elon Musk
(@elonmusk)
tweeted:

They posted my exact real-time location, basically assassination coordinates, in (obvious) direct violation of Twitter terms of service

December 16, 2022

Avatar of Elon Musk

Elon Musk
(@elonmusk)
tweeted:

7 day suspension for doxxing. Some time away from Twitter is good for the soul ...

December 16, 2022

=== Explanation from Twitter and Musk ===
Musk publicly responded to the journalist suspensions a few hours after they occurred. He said the accounts were suspended for doxxing, specifically in violation of Twitter's new rule banning accounts that track the location and movement of private jets. That new rule was created on December 14, 2022, the day before the journalist accounts were suspended, in response to accounts that provided information about Musk's private jet. Musk said the suspended accounts posted his "exact real-time location, basically assassination coordinates, in (obvious) direct violation of Twitter terms of service".

Musk defended his actions in a series of tweets. In one, he wrote: "Same doxxing rules apply to 'journalists' as to everyone else". In another, he wrote: "Criticizing me all day long is totally fine, but doxxing my real-time location and endangering my family is not." Ella Irwin, Twitter's head of trust and safety, told Reuters that the organization manually reviewed "any and all accounts" in violation of the policy, which included posting links to @ElonJet. She said: "I understand that the focus seems to be mainly on journalist accounts but we applied the policy equally to journalists and non-journalist accounts today."

A few hours after the suspensions, Musk defended the action during a discussion on Twitter Spaces, a social audio feature of the platform, which was hosted by BuzzFeed reporter Katie Notopoulos and had more than 30,000 listeners. Several of the suspended journalists as well as the creator of the @ElonJet account participated, and were able to join due to a bug that allowed suspended accounts to join Twitter Spaces. During the conversation, Musk repeatedly said, "You doxx, you get suspended. End of story. That's it." Drew Harwell, one of the suspended journalists, was able to dialogue with Musk about the suspensions briefly, but Musk left the chat a few minutes after joining, and the Twitter Spaces service was abruptly shut down, disconnecting all the users in Notopoulos's space. Musk later said Twitter Spaces was temporarily unavailable due to a "legacy bug" and that it "should be working tomorrow". The Twitter Spaces feature remained offline for several hours, although several users, including the conversation's host, found themselves suspended from the service once it became available again.

Following the Mastodon account suspension and ban on sending Mastodon links, a new policy was introduced on December 18 that prohibited sharing of links to a variety of social media sites, including Facebook and Instagram, along with Mastodon. The new Twitter policy would have disallowed such links in tweets and on account profiles, and would trigger suspensions of accounts in violation of this rule. By December 19, Twitter's new linking policy and official mentions about it had been removed, and Musk later said that banning users for posting Mastodon links was a mistake.

== Reinstatement of some accounts ==
Avatar of Elon Musk

Elon Musk
(@elonmusk)
tweeted:

Unsuspend accounts who doxxed my exact location in real-time

Now	43%
Tomorrow	4.5%
7 days from now	14.4%
Longer	38.1%

December 16, 2022

Avatar of Elon Musk

Elon Musk
(@elonmusk)
tweeted:

Unsuspend accounts who doxxed my exact location in real-time

Now	58.7%
In 7 days	41.3%

December 16, 2022

On December 15, Musk issued a Twitter poll asking when the suspensions should be lifted. Musk had previously made a similar poll where the majority had voted to reinstate Trump's account, with Musk saying, "The people have spoken... Vox Populi, Vox Dei". But Forbes wrote that it is unclear whether these unscientific polls truly inform or influence Musk. Musk's poll had four options, and while a majority voted for 7 days or longer, a plurality (43%) voted for immediate reinstatement. Musk then wrote in a response tweet, "Sorry too many options. Will redo poll", and issued a new poll. The second poll asked users whether he should "unsuspend accounts who doxxed my exact location in real-time", and provided only two options "Now" or "In 7 days". The final result was "Now", with about 59 percent choosing that option.

On December 17, Musk said he would reinstate most of the suspended accounts, writing of the poll results, "The people have spoken". But some accounts were not restored. Linette Lopez, who had published investigations into Tesla, Inc., where Musk was CEO, remained suspended on Twitter and had not heard anything from the platform about possible reinstatement. Several of the journalists said account restoration appeared to be contingent on the voluntary deletion of specific posts. Drew Harwell was told his account would be restored if he deleted tweets on the suspension of Mastodon's account. Steven L. Herman said his account is now visible to others, but he cannot use it because he won't delete three tweets that Twitter claimed were sharing Musk's location. Herman said: "I am in a new level of purgatory. I do not believe anything I have tweeted violate any reasonable standard of any social media platform." Micah Lee also said that, while his account was technically reinstated, he was still locked out unless he agreed to delete some of his past tweets. Lee called the claim that his suspension was lifted "an illusion".

== Responses ==
=== Suspended journalists ===
The journalists were not initially told if their accounts had been permanently or temporarily suspended, and not informed why they had been blocked or what specific rule was violated. Immediately after the suspension, Rupar said he was given no information about why the action occurred, saying he hadn't "been given a reason, explanation, or been looped in about any possible duration." Rupar added that he "didn't post anything remotely controversial today or anytime recently". Micah Lee also said he was not given a reason for the suspension, but said it came shortly after he posted on Twitter about Mastodon's account suspension. Lee also wrote: "While my reporting may not have provided the direct impetus for my suspension, it's clear Musk was taking aim specifically at journalists who have covered him critically." Olbermann's suspension occurred shortly after he had criticized the suspension of other journalists. Rupar's suspension came one day after he had shared a Substack article by Noah Berlatsky that was critical of Musk, "Elon Musk's reactionary populism". After Musk's explanation about the suspensions, Rupar said he had not posted anything that violated the policy about disclosing locations, and had never posted anything about @ElonJet prior to his suspension, adding: "Unless the policy is that you criticize Elon and you get suspended."

Some of the suspended journalists had written stories about Musk suspending @ElonJet, though others had not. Matt Binder said he did not share any location data or links to jet-tracking accounts, and was suspended immediately after sharing a screenshot that Donie O'Sullivan posted before his own suspension. Binder said, "I have been highly critical of Musk but never broke any of Twitter's listed policies." Linette Lopez said of her suspension: "Its funny that Elon suddenly has a problem with doxxing and harassing people because he [also] has a history of doing that". Harwell said he did not share information about Musk's private jet or personal location, but simply posted a link to the @ElonJet account in his stories. In a direct conversation with Musk on Twitter Spaces, Harwell said: "We have to acknowledge you are using the same exact link-blocking technique that you have criticized as part of the Hunter Biden–New York Post story in 2020." In an interview with CNN, Harwell said: "Elon says he is a free speech champion and he is banning journalists for exercising free speech. I think that calls into question his commitment."

=== Other commentators ===
New York Times external communications director Charlie Stadtlander said the suspensions were "questionable and unfortunate" and that neither the organization nor Times journalist Ryan Mac was given an adequate explanation for the decision to suspend the accounts. Washington Post Executive Editor Sally Buzbee said the suspensions occurred "without warning, process, or explanation" and that they "directly undermined Elon Musk's claim that he intends to run Twitter as a platform dedicated to free speech". CNN said that Musk's actions were "impulsive and unjustified" but "not surprising", and that it would reevaluate its relationship with Twitter. The CNN statement also said: "Twitter's increasing instability and volatility should be of incredible concern for everyone who uses Twitter." Oliver Darcy, a CNN reporter, wrote that Musk's allegations of doxxing were "not what those journalists did". Cybersecurity writer Brian Krebs said Twitter's claim that Mastodon links might have malware was a "bald-faced lie". Lou Paskalis, a media executive, said the suspensions could create uncertainty among news organizations and advertisers. Paskalis said the bans were "the biggest self-inflicted wound I can think of".

Commentators have been critical of the suspensions, including media outlets and international representatives, officials from several countries, the United Nations and European Union. Many critics said the actions undermined Musk's claims of supporting free speech. The suspensions were labeled by Alex Stamos, a security researcher, and Micah Lee from The Intercept, the "Thursday Night Massacre".

Avatar of Alexandria Ocasio-Cortez

Alexandria Ocasio-Cortez
Twitter
@AOC

You're a public figure. An extremely controversial and powerful one.

I get feeling unsafe, but descending into abuse of power + erratically banning journalists only increases the intensity around you.

Take a beat and lay off the proto-fascism. Maybe try putting down your phone.

December 16, 2022

Avatar of Elon Musk

Elon Musk
Twitter
@elonmusk

They posted my exact real-time location, basically assassination coordinates, in (obvious) direct violation of Twitter terms of service

December 16, 2022

United Nations spokeswoman Melissa Fleming said she was disturbed by the bans and that "media freedom is not a toy". Stephane Dujarric, another UN spokesperson, said they were reconsidering their involvement with Twitter, and that the suspensions set "a dangerous precedent at a time when journalists all over the world are facing censorship, physical threats and even worse". U.S. Representative Alexandria Ocasio-Cortez wrote public tweets directly to Musk, saying the suspensions were irresponsible and only increased the scrutiny around him, adding that he should "lay off the proto-fascism." Věra Jourová, the Vice-President of the European Commission for Values and Transparency, said on December 16 that "news about arbitrary suspension of journalists on Twitter is worrying."

European Commission officials said Musk's actions may have violated the Digital Services Act, which could result in sanctions or even a ban on the social media platform across all of Europe. Johannes Bahrke, of the European Commission, said it was encouraging that some journalists were reinstated, but was concerned about Musk using informal Twitter polls to make such decisions rather than through a clearly defined framework.

Roland Lescure, the French Minister of Commerce, ceased all of his Twitter activity in protest. The German Foreign Office warned that the suspensions jeopardize press freedom. The Society for Advancing Business Editing and Writing said Twitter's actions "violate the spirit of the First Amendment and the principle that social media platforms will allow the unfiltered distribution of information that is already in the public square".

Bari Weiss, who worked with Musk to publish the Twitter Files, disagreed and argued with Musk on Twitter about his decision, saying, "the old regime at Twitter [was] governed by its own whims and biases...[and] it sure looks like the new regime has the same problem". On December 16, Wired reporter Amanda Hoover quoted John Davisson, a senior counsel at the Electronic Privacy Information Center, saying, "Musk is responding to events that affect him personally to reshape that policy and place new limits on what could be disseminated through the platform". Hoover concluded, "This new approach will have a lasting impact on Twitter."

The Government Accountability Project, a whistleblower protection and advocacy organization, filed a complaint to the United States Congress on December 22, saying Musk "abused his authority by acting arbitrarily and capriciously" in suspending the journalists. David Seide, senior counsel with the organization, called the actions "disturbing" and urged Congress to "review this mistreatment" and investigate further. Brendan Carr, an FCC commissioner, said that "one person should not get to decide who participates in the digital town square".

== See also ==
- Twitter suspensions
