= Linette Lopez =

American journalist

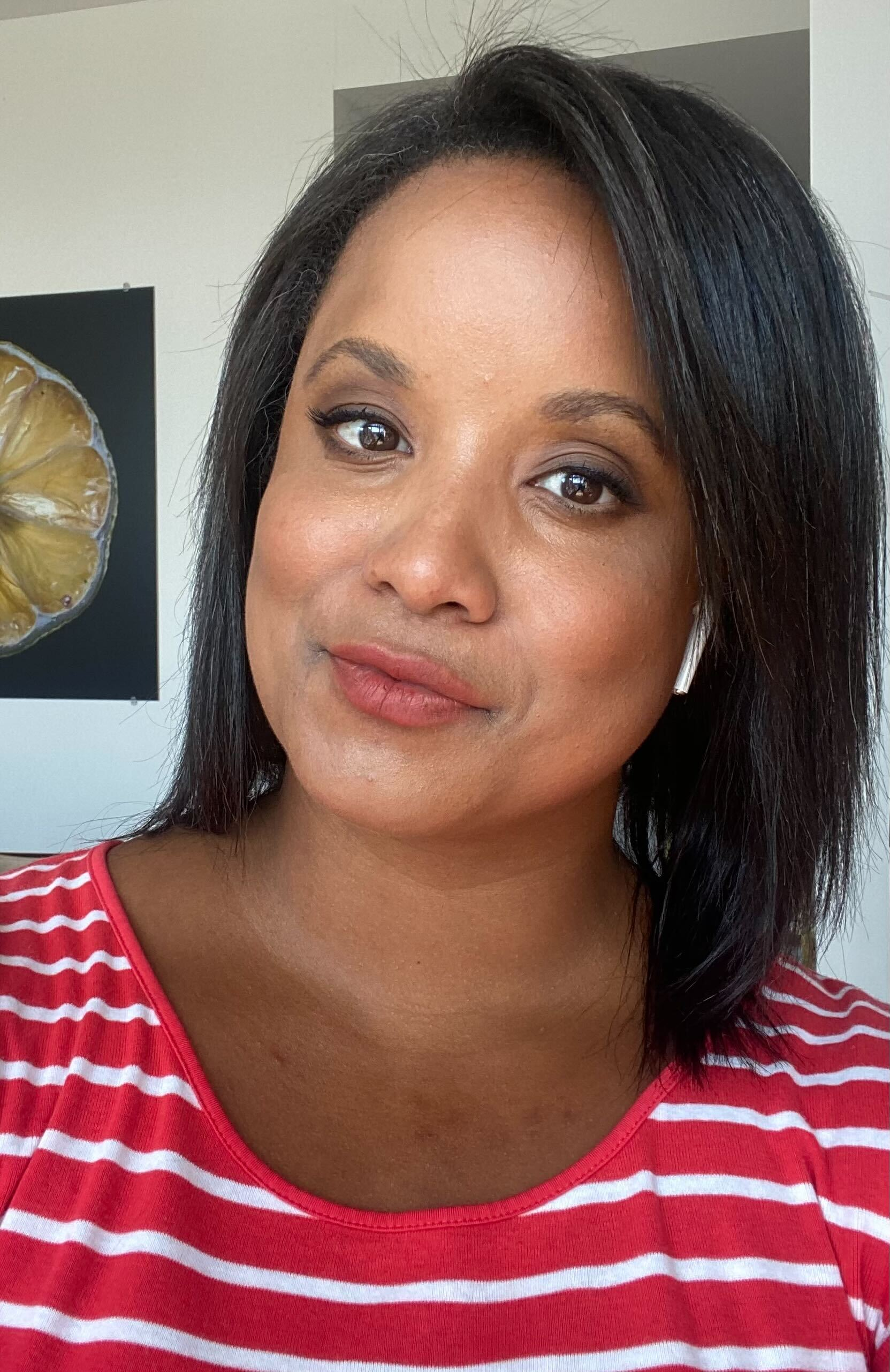
- Born: Elkins, West Virginia, U.S.
- Education: Columbia University (BA, MS)
- Occupation: Journalist
- Employer: Business Insider

Linette Lopez (born c. 1986) is an American journalist who focuses on U.S. politics and economics, and writes columns for Business Insider. As a senior finance editor, she has investigated companies involved with public-facing controversies, and is most widely known for her coverage of Tesla, Inc. A regular contributor to Marketplace produced by American Public Media, Lopez teaches as an adjunct professor at the Columbia University Graduate School of Journalism. She has also been a frequent commentator on CNN, MSNBC, and Real Time with Bill Maher.

In 2017, Lopez was recognized as a "Rising Star" in the Folio: Top Women in Media honors. In 2020, she received the Excellence in Financial Journalism Award from the New York State Society of CPAs (NYSSCPA) for her opinion piece, “The Huawei indictment marks the end of US and China's cycle of trust”.

In June 2023, Lopez was awarded the New York Press Club Award for Journalism for her article, "The Stock Market Had It Coming".

== Early life and education ==
The daughter of immigrants from the Dominican Republic, Lopez was born in Elkins, West Virginia. She is fluent in Spanish. Her father was a physician who did his residency in Buffalo, New York. She went to State College Area High School in State College, Pennsylvania.

Lopez studied history and sociology at Columbia University, and received her Bachelor of Arts degree in 2008. She was a press intern for New York mayor Michael Bloomberg, and worked for one year for New York state senator Jeff Klein. Deciding to pursue a career in journalism, she went back to the Graduate School of Journalism at Columbia. In graduate school, she studied business, wrote about underground music, and investigated misinformation emanating from Russia, and completed her degree in 2011.

== Career ==
Lopez was an early employee at Business Insider, joining in 2011 as a markets intern. She became a breaking news reporter and covered Occupy Wall Street. Lopez went on to take over as editor of the finance section and started covering corporate fraud. More recently, she has worked as a columnist at Business Insider.

According to Common Ground by Jane Whitney, which has featured Lopez as a panelist, her willingness to "[take] on titans in tech, politics, and business" ranging from Mark Zuckerberg to Donald Trump has made her the target of "intimidatory social media campaigns that have become all too familiar to 21st century journalists".

=== Coverage of Elon Musk's businesses ===
At Insider, Lopez covered entrepreneur Elon Musk's businesses, exposing issues including alleged safety lapses at Tesla, Inc. She also questioned the ethics and motivation behind some of his financial transactions, such as his 2016 bailout of SolarCity, a company founded by his cousins which had accumulated massive debt.

In 2018, Lopez wrote that Tesla had stopped performing a brake test on its Model 3 electric sedan, in an effort to accelerate production at its assembly line, which had been fraught with problems. In 2019, she wrote that she had "counted at least 20 reported incidents of Teslas catching on fire since 2013 and five deaths in the past 14 months".

In 2020, Lopez wrote articles accusing Tesla of selling the Model S, despite being aware of a battery design flaw that could lead to fires as early as 2012. Although industry observers such as InsideEVs expressed skepticism because Lopez had chosen not to publish the two analysis reports written by external engineering firms which concluded that the aluminum used in manufacturing was prone to cracks, Russ Mitchell of The Los Angeles Times subsequently confirmed the claims in her Business Insider story after reviewing the contents of the emails and documents, and interviewing his own sources. Her coverage of Tesla specifically ended in 2021.

=== Retaliation by Musk ===
In 2018, Musk openly disputed Lopez's reporting by claiming that she had written "several false articles". He also falsely claimed Lopez was on the payroll of short sellers betting against Tesla and, in the case of Martin Tripp's whistleblowing, paid bribes to Tripp to steal company secrets. Writing for Slate, Felix Salmon said in 2018 that "Musk's harassment of Lopez is obsessive and deranged" and that it went beyond stalking, because he was "setting his army of fanboys loose on Lopez".

In 2022, Lopez's Twitter account was suspended following the December 15, 2022 Twitter suspensions of many journalists, whom Musk accused of doxing his whereabouts. Her account remained blocked without explanation after other journalists had theirs reinstated days later. According to Lopez, her account had been suspended after sharing court documents on Twitter alleging that Musk had hacked and doxed people. Several journalists and researchers tweeted their support for Lopez, noting that she had been "early & tireless in reporting issues at Musk's companies" and highlighting her past coverage.

== Selected articles ==
=== Occupy Wall Street ===
- Lopez, Linette (October 14, 2011). "Occupy Wall Street's Plans for a National Convention". Business Insider.
- Lopez, Linette (October 14, 2011). "Another Huge Weekend: Occupy Wall Street Is Coming to Your Neighborhood". CNBC.
- Lopez, Linette (October 20, 2011). "The Occupy Wall Street TV Ad Could Actually Air on TV". The Atlantic.
- Johnson, Robert and Lopez, Linette (November 14, 2011). "This Weekend's Occupy Crackdowns May Be The Beginning Of The End For Protest Groups". Business Insider.
- Jonnson, Robert and Lopez, Linette (November 15, 2011). "This Week's Occupy Evictions Were Systematically Plotted By The Nation's Mayors." Business Insider.
- Lopez, Linette and Du, Lisa (May 1, 2012). "Occupy Wall Street Has Gathered In Union Square, And The Demonstration Looks HUGE". Business Insider.
- Lopez, Linette (January 16, 2014). "How Occupy Wall Street Won in One Chart". Business Insider.

=== Tesla ===
- Lopez, Linette (June 4, 2018). "Internal documents reveal Tesla is blowing through an insane amount of raw material and cash to make Model 3s, and production is still a nightmare". Business Insider.
- Lopez, Linette (July 3, 2018). "Elon Musk ordered Tesla engineers to stop doing a critical brake test on Model 3s". Business Insider.
- Lopez, Linette (April 26, 2019). "Life, death, and spontaneous combustion — here's why the debate about Tesla fires just got more fierce". Business Insider.
- Lopez, Linette (May 22, 2019). "One of Tesla's biggest bulls just turned around and trashed the company on a private call with Wall Street". Business Insider.
- Lopez, Linette (October 30, 2019). "The future of Elon Musk's empire was in peril in 2016, and new documents reveal more about the desperate plan to save it". Business Insider.
- Lopez, Linette (June 24, 2020). "Tesla knew its Model S battery had a design flaw that could lead to leaks and ultimately fires, starting in 2012. It sold the car anyway." Business Insider.
- Lopez, Linette (June 25, 2020). "Leaked Tesla emails tell the story of a design flaw discovered in 2012 in the Model S battery that could lead to breakdowns and fires". Business Insider.
- Lopez, Linette (December 1, 2020). "The bizarre case of Elon Musk and the Tesla whistleblower has closed, but questions about millions of dollars wasted at the Gigafactory remain". Business Insider.
- Lopez, Linette (December 10, 2023). "Elon Musk's luck has finally run out". Business Insider.
