= Steven L. Herman =

American journalist

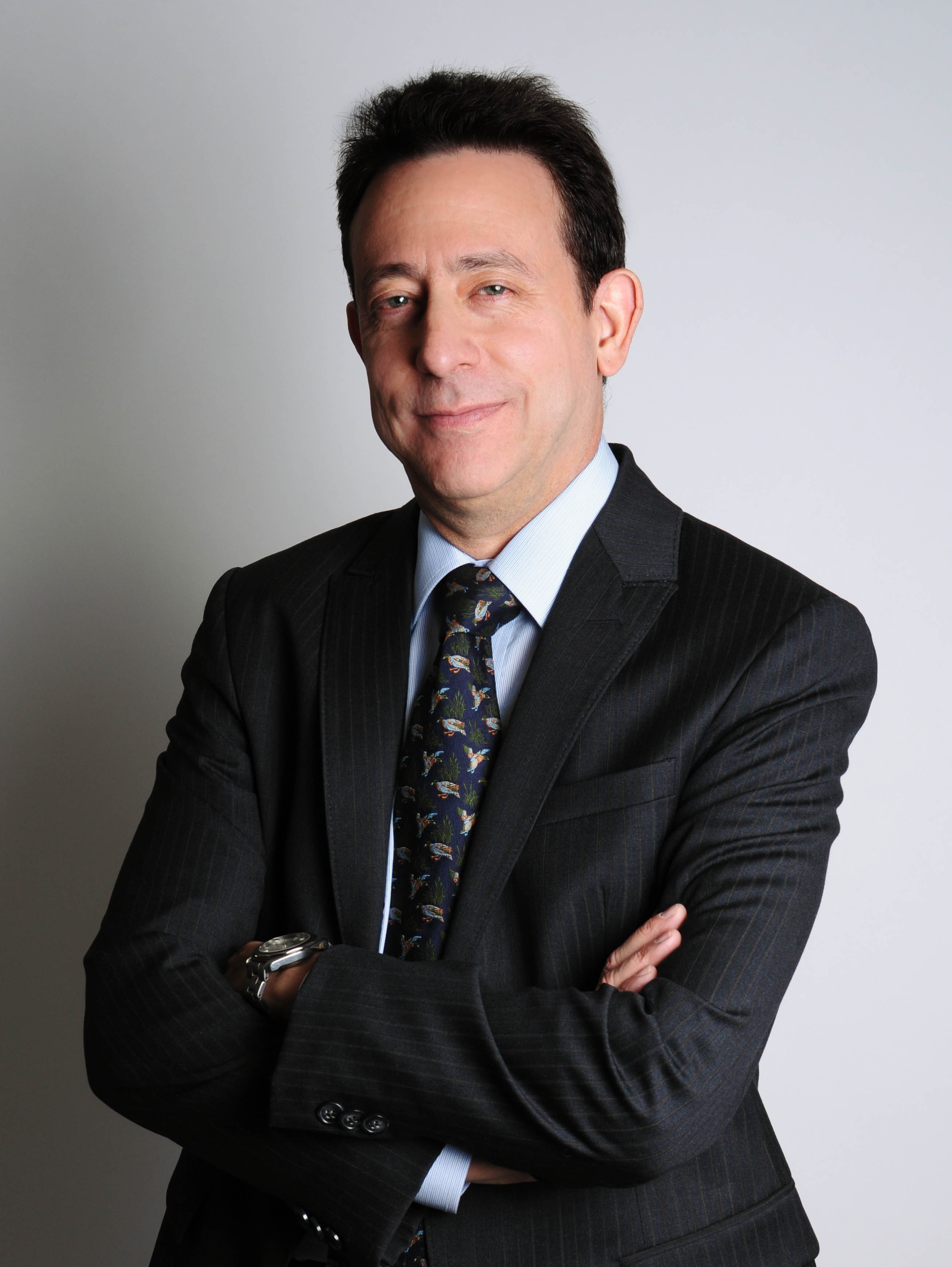
Steven L. Herman

Steven L Herman is an educator, journalist and author, and, as of July 2025, the executive director of the Jordan Center for Journalism Advocacy and Innovation at the University of Mississippi.

From 2017 through 2025, Herman was the Voice of America’s senior White House correspondent, then subsequently White House bureau chief and chief national correspondent.

== Early life and education ==
Herman was born in Cincinnati, Ohio, and grew up in Las Vegas, Nevada, where he began his career in journalism and broadcasting.

Herman has served as a Council on Foreign Relations higher education ambassador, an adjunct lecturer in the University of Richmond's journalism department and an adjunct associate professor at Shenandoah University.

Herman was a Kiplinger Fellow at Ohio University, a JURIST journalist in residence at the University of Pittsburgh School of Law and a fellow at the journalism law school at Loyola Marymount University.

== Career ==
Herman was one of the few journalists to spend time in the Fukushima I Nuclear Power Plant "hot zone" and visit the grounds of the crippled facility in April 2011.

Herman served a term as presidents of the Foreign Correspondents' Club of Japan (FCCJ) and the Seoul Foreign Correspondents' Club. He has served on the board of governors of the Overseas Press Club and the American Foreign Service Association.

As part of the December 2022 Twitter suspensions, Herman's Twitter account was temporarily suspended.

On Feb. 28, 2025, the U.S. Agency for Global Media announced that Herman was being placed on an extended “excused absence” due to an ongoing human resources investigation into whether his “social media activity has undermined V.O.A.’s audiences’ perceptions of the objectivity and/or credibility of V.O.A. and its news operations.” Two weeks later, nearly all of VOA’s fulltime staff were also placed on paid administrative leave.

He has frequently appeared on BBC and MSNBC and was profiled by CBS’ 60 Minutes following the Trump administration’s efforts to shut down the Voice of America.

He is currently on the board of governors of the National Press Club and JURIST news.

=== As an author ===
- Bhutan in Color 2007- A Himalayan Kingdom Through the Lens of an American Journalist (2008)
- Behind the White House Curtain A Senior Journalist’s Story of Covering the president—and Why It Matters (2024)

== See also ==
- Would take 'Herculean effort' to rebuild: Voice of America employee speaks out amid Trump order
