= Donie O'Sullivan (journalist) =

Irish journalist (born 1991)

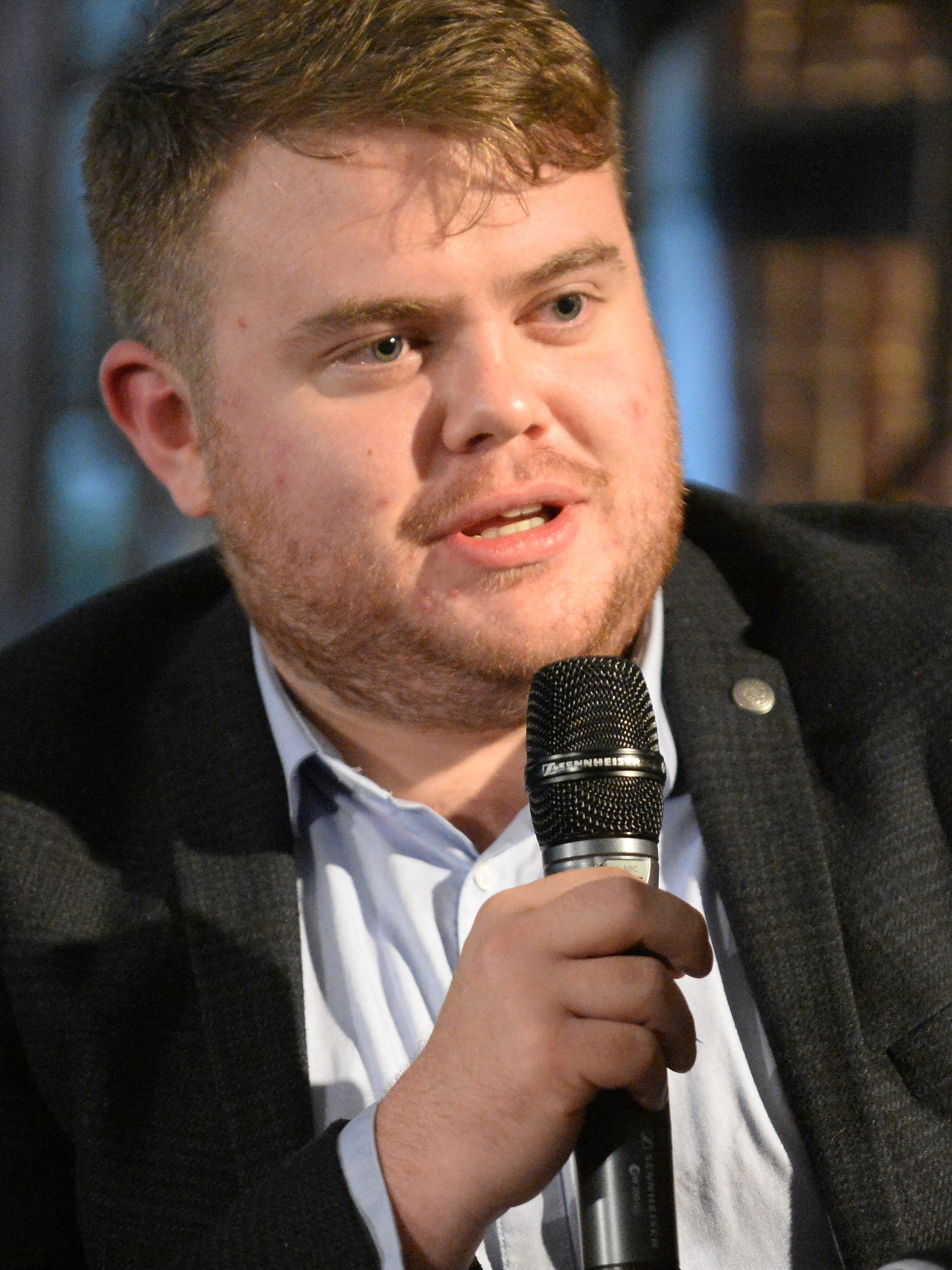
- O'Sullivan in 2015
- Born: Donal O'Sullivan; 24 March 1991 (age 35); Cahersiveen, County Kerry, Ireland
- Education: University College Dublin (BA); Queen's University Belfast (MA)
- Occupation: Journalist

Donie O'Sullivan (born 24 March 1991) is an Irish-American journalist who works as a host and senior correspondent for CNN in New York. He has hosted the CNN series Devoted with Donie O'Sullivan since 2025. Born in Ireland, he holds both Irish and US citizenship.

== Early life ==
Originally from Cahersiveen in County Kerry, O'Sullivan attended Coláiste na Sceilge, graduating in 2009. He graduated from University College Dublin in 2012 with a degree in history and politics, and has a masters in political science from Queen's University Belfast.

== Career ==
He worked for Storyful in Dublin and New York, and joined CNN in 2016.

O'Sullivan has covered the impact of social media on politics and received praise for his live reporting on CNN during the 2021 United States Capitol attack.

When Mike Lindell held a three-day "Cyber Symposium" in August 2021, with a promise that he would present "irrefutable evidence" of election fraud, O'Sullivan attended and brought cybersecurity expert Harri Hursti to the conference; Hursti said that Lindell's purported evidence was a "pile of nothing" and found no proof of election fraud.

In 2021, O'Sullivan's work on a story about a COVID-19 "patient-zero conspiracy theory" (broadcast by CNN in 2020) was nominated for a News & Documentary Emmy Award. Donie O'Sullivan: Capitol Man, a documentary covering O'Sullivan's own life and move from "a small town in Kerry to become an international household name", was commissioned by RTÉ Television, and broadcast in Ireland in January 2022.

In December 2022, O'Sullivan's Twitter account was among several journalists' accounts that were suspended after covering Twitter's owner Elon Musk during the Twitter suspensions of December 2022. Musk accused O’Sullivan of violating Twitter's policy on doxing.

In September 2023, he worked on an episode of the CNN series The Whole Story With Anderson Cooper, Titled Waiting for JFK: Report from the Fringe, the episode focused on the toll conspiracy theories were having on American families.

Writing in Mediaite in December 2024, Alex Griffing criticised O'Sullivan for profiling Hasan Piker without pressing him on what Griffing described as Piker's "more extreme views" (such as Piker's statement that "America deserved 9/11" or defence of Hamas) stating that this was an omission from O'Sullivan as he had "got his start covering online misinformation and extremism".

O'Sullivan hosted a CNN special MisinfoNation: White Genocide filmed in South Africa in 2025. The documentary examined President Trump's false claims that a "white genocide" was occurring in the country. An interview O'Sullivan conducted with Errol Musk, the father of Elon Musk, received widespread attention. Errol Musk made a number of controversial comments during the interview, including stating that the United States would be "doomed" if it became a minority white country.

O'Sullivan has hosted the CNN series Devoted with Donie O'Sullivan since October 2025. Variety reported that the series follow O'Sullivan as he joins "people on spiritual journeys as they seek out new sources of meaning".

== Awards ==
During the 2024 US presidential campaign, O'Sullivan led reporting for three hour-long CNN specials titled "MisinfoNation", as part of The Whole Story With Anderson Cooper. O'Sullivan was promoted to senior correspondent at CNN in July 2024. O'Sullivan was awarded a News & Documentary Emmy for Outstanding Recorded News program for his work on the series.

A limited three-episode narrative podcast series, entitled Persuadable and hosted by O'Sullivan, was released in April 2025 and focused on why people are drawn to conspiracy theories. The series was nominated for an Ambie podcast award in the "Best Reporting" category.

== Personal life ==
O'Sullivan has spoken about his struggles with anxiety and depression and the importance of seeking help for mental health issues.
