= Lou Paskalis =

Marketer

Lou Paskalis is a prominent advertising industry executive and strategic thought leader, widely recognized for his expertise in digital transformation, data governance, and media accountability. He currently serves as the Chief Strategy Officer of Ad Fontes Media a news media accountability company that rates over 100,000 individual news articles on bias and reliability every day, and is the Founder and CEO of AJL Advisory LLC, a strategic marketing consultancy.

== Education ==
Paskalis has an MBA in Marketing and Finance and a B.S. in business management from the University of Notre Dame.

== Career ==
A respected industry veteran since 1990, Paskalis is frequently quoted in leading business publications including The Wall Street Journal, Forbes, and Adweek for his strategic insights on digital transformation, privacy, brand safety and social media. His thought leadership has shaped industry discourse on critical issues such as media accountability, data governance, and responsible platform engagement.

In 2023, Paskalis was appointed Chief Strategy Officer of Ad Fontes Media, where he leads strategic initiatives to enhance business building opportunities in news media for advertisers seeking to grow their business. His appointment followed his successful tenure as President and COO of MMA Global (2021-2023) where he drove the association's strategic evolution and expanded its focus on data privacy and media effectiveness.

As Senior Vice President of Customer Engagement and Media Investment at Bank of America (2013-2021), Paskalis architected the organization's digital transformation strategy for marketing and reimagined pioneering frameworks for marketing data governance. He led the bank's Marketing Data Enablement and Marketing Data Use Governance platforms, and notably established the first dedicated Brand Safety and Suitability practice among Fortune 500 companies. His innovative approach to data-driven marketing has been widely adopted as an industry standard.

Previously, as Vice President of Global Media, Content Development and Mobile Marketing at American Express American Express., Paskalis spearheaded early adoption of digital and mobile marketing strategies, helping position the company at the forefront of marketing innovation. His career began at Gallo Wines in the 1990s, where he led Media Investment and Sponsorship Marketing initiatives.

In 2022, Paskalis gained additional prominence for his outspoken advocacy of responsible content moderation when he was temporarily blocked on Twitter after criticizing Elon Musk's decision to reduce content moderation. staff, reflecting his consistent stance on brand safety and platform accountability.
