= Twitter under Elon Musk =

Elon Musk completed an acquisition of Twitter in October 2022; Musk acted as CEO of Twitter until June 2023 when he was succeeded by Linda Yaccarino. Twitter was rebranded to X on July 23, 2023, and its domain name changed from twitter.com to x.com on May 17, 2024. Yaccarino resigned on July 9, 2025.

Now operating as X, the platform closely resembles its predecessor but includes additional features such as long-form texts, account monetization options, audio-video calls, integration with xAI's Grok chatbot, job search, and a repurposing of the platform's verification system as a subscription premium. Several legacy Twitter features were removed from the site after Musk acquired Twitter, including Circles, NFT profile pictures, and the experimental pronouns in profiles feature. Musk's aims included transforming X into a "digital town square" and an "everything app" akin to WeChat.

Twitter/X has faced significant controversy under Musk's ownership. Issues such as the release of the Twitter Files, suspension of ten journalists' accounts, and labeling media outlets as "state-affiliated" and restricting their visibility have sparked criticism. Despite Musk stepping down as CEO, the platform has continued to face criticism over issues such as viral misinformation, hate speech (especially antisemitism), and child pornography. In response to allegations it deemed unfair, X Corp. has pursued legal action against nonprofit organizations Media Matters and the Center for Countering Digital Hate.

== History ==
=== Acquisition of Twitter ===
Avatar of Elon Musk

Elon Musk
(@elonmusk)
tweeted:

I made an offer
https://sec.gov/Archives/edgar...

April 14, 2022

Elon Musk initiated the acquisition of Twitter, Inc. on April 14, 2022, and completed it on October 28, 2022. His goal was to transform Twitter into X, an all-encompassing app inspired by WeChat. By April, Musk had become Twitter's largest shareholder with a 9.2 percent stake and made an unsolicited $44 billion offer on April 14, which Twitter's board initially resisted before accepting on April 25. In July, Musk attempted to terminate the deal, citing Twitter's failure to address spam bot accounts. Twitter sued him, with a trial set for mid-October. Musk then reversed his decision and completed the acquisition on October 28. He became the new owner and CEO, took Twitter private, merged it into X Corp., and fired several top executives, including CEO Parag Agrawal. Following Twitter's change in ownership, Musk renamed several features to remove references to bird-oriented terminology, including renaming "Birdwatch" to "Community Notes". In October, Musk ordered Twitter employees to revamp multiple aspects of the program within one week, enlisting employees from his other companies, including Tesla, the Boring Company, and Neuralink, as well as investors Jason Calacanis and Sriram Krishnan. To meet these deadlines, many staff members were told to work longer hours.

Musk is not the sole owner of X Corp.; it is owned by artificial intelligence company xAI, which acquired it from its previous owner X Holdings Corp. (XHC) on March 28, 2025. xAI, including X, was in turn acquired by SpaceX on February 2, 2026. Prior to the xAI acquisition, investors in XHC included entities linked to Bill Ackman, Larry Ellison, Marc Andreessen, and Sean Combs. The court filing also reflects that over 20 Fidelity-associated funds, trusts and pools were investors in XHC.

=== Post-acquisition ===
On July 23, 2023, Musk announced the rebranding of Twitter to X, which started when the X.com domain (formerly associated with PayPal) began redirecting to Twitter; the logo was changed from the bird to the X the next day, and the platform's official main and associated accounts also began using the letter X within their handles. The @x handle was originally owned by photographer Gene X Hwang, who registered it in 2007. Hwang had expressed willingness to sell the handle, but received an email stating that the company was taking it, and was not offered financial benefits. The Android app's name and icon were changed to X on Google Play by July 27; the same change went live on the App Store on July 31 after Apple granted an exception to its minimum character length of 2. Around that time, some more elements of the Twitter branding were removed from the web version, including tweets being renamed to "posts".

The rebrand was described as unusual, given that Twitter's brand was already strong internationally, with words like "tweet" having entered common language. The rebranding was criticized on the basis that the trademarkability of the name and logo is weak: there are almost 900 companies in the U.S. that own an X trademark, including an existing social media-related logo owned by Meta Platforms. The X logo uses a blackboard bold X, a character that has appeared in mathematical textbooks since the 1970s and that is included in Unicode as U+1D54F 𝕏 MATHEMATICAL DOUBLE-STRUCK CAPITAL X. A few days after the rebrand took effect, an AP Stylebook update recommended that journalists refer to the platform as "X, formerly known as Twitter". By September 2023, Ad Age, citing The Harris Poll, noted that the rebranding had not publicly caught on, with the majority of users still referring to X as "Twitter". On May 17, 2024, Musk announced that the URL was officially changed from twitter.com to x.com, with the domain transition being one of the more awkward aspects of Musk's rebranding the company.

In 2024, Musk moved the headquarters of X to Bastrop, Texas, a town near Austin.

Social media sites including X came under questioning for their handling of disinformation related to the 2024 United Kingdom riots. Musk criticised UK Prime Minister Keir Starmer amid the riots, saying "Shouldn't you be concerned about attacks on *all* communities?". Responding to a post with footage of the disorder that said the riots were due to the "effects of mass migration and open borders", Musk tweeted "Civil war is inevitable", and his comments were condemned by Starmer's official spokesman. Having previously restored Tommy Robinson's account, Musk interacted with him on the platform, and went on to refer to Starmer as "two-tier Keir" and ask the protection of communities in Britain. Musk also promoted a conspiracy theory that the UK government was planning to build detainments camps in the Falkland Islands to hold rioters. The UK's Secretary of State for Science, Innovation and Technology Peter Kyle said that in practice dealing with large tech companies and their leaders can be more like negotiating with foreign states than normal businesses.

In December 2024, the X website was redesigned, giving it a more modern and simplified look alongside removing the last elements of the Twitter branding (such as blue colors). Musk argued in February 2025 that X's Community Notes "is increasingly being gamed by governments & legacy media", and that he was taking steps to "fix" it. The statement came after Community Notes contradicted Musk's claims on astronauts and legacy media, and also contradicted claims that Ukrainian President Volodymyr Zelenskyy was unpopular among Ukrainians.

In 2025 the Wall Street Journal reported that Musk had used the platform to solicit an influencer he had never met in person to have his child. Following their rejection of his offer he unfollowed their account and their impressions and revenue declined sharply.

=== Layoffs and mass resignations ===
Avatar of Elon Musk

Elon Musk
(@elonmusk)
tweeted:

Regarding Twitter's reduction in force, unfortunately there is no choice when the company is losing over $4M/day.
Everyone exited was offered 3 months of severance, which is 50% more than legally required.

November 4, 2022

On November 4, 2022, Twitter under Musk began laying off a substantial portion of the company's workforce and temporarily closed its offices, with The New York Times estimating that roughly half of employees had been let go. The night before the layoffs, five Twitter employees based in San Francisco and Cambridge, Massachusetts, filed a lawsuit against the company, alleging that mass layoffs would violate federal and California WARN Acts. Musk explained that the layoffs were a cost-cutting measure and stated that the company had been losing over $4 million a day, and criticized activist groups who had called on advertisers to cease doing business with the company. The Times described the layoffs as "haphazard", Twitter's internal directory, Birdhouse, was taken offline and Twitter offices worldwide were closed for the weekend.

On November 6, Twitter asked some employees who had been laid off to return to the company. Days after the layoffs, Twitter terminated a large number of its contractors, and Musk fired a series of employees who criticized him publicly or within the company. On November 16, Musk delivered an ultimatum to employees via email: commit to "extremely hardcore" work in order to realize Musk's vision of "Twitter 2.0", or leave. In response, hundreds of Twitter employees resigned the next day, hours before the deadline to respond to Musk's email. Business Insider reported that fewer than 2,000 employees remained at the company. Musk and his advisers met with several employees to dissuade them from leaving the company, while Twitter offices were once again closed until November 21. Despite the closures, Musk summoned all Twitter software engineers to Twitter's headquarters on November 18, seeking greater insight into the platform's solution stack. Additional layoffs occurred later that month, and the company resumed hiring. Musk continued laying off employees in February 2023, promising substantial "performance-based stock awards" to employees who remained at the company.

Avatar of Elon Musk

Elon Musk
(@elonmusk)
tweeted:

press@twitter.com now auto responds with 💩

March 19, 2023

In November 2022, Axios reported that Twitter had fired almost all of its communications team, leaving only one member. From November 2022 to March 2023, Twitter's communications team was "effectively silent" and not responding to press inquiries, reported NPR. In March 2023, Musk personally announced a new Twitter policy, which brought Twitter in-line with Musk's other businesses which do not have press or communications departments. During the April 2023 controversy, NPR confirmed that a press inquiry it sent to Twitter was responded to by Twitter with an emoji of feces. In April 2023, Musk told the BBC that he had reduced staff from around 8,000 to under 1,500. In June 2023, trust and safety chief Ella Irwin resigned, hours after Musk undid a company moderation decision by unrestricting and reposting The Daily Wire's documentary What Is a Woman?.

=== Resignation poll ===
Avatar of Elon Musk

Elon Musk
(@elonmusk)
tweeted:

Should I step down as head of Twitter? I will abide by the results of this poll.

Yes	57.5%
No	42.5%
17,502,391 votes · Final results

December 18, 2022

On November 16, 2022, Musk stated that he planned to eventually appoint a new CEO to oversee Twitter, shortly thereafter beginning the process of searching for his successor. On December 18, amid growing public discontent surrounding the ElonJet and Mastodon controversies, Musk conducted an open-access Twitter poll asking whether he should resign from his position as Twitter CEO, claiming that he would "abide by the results". The poll resolved to "yes" after 57.5 percent of 17.5 million users voted in favor of him stepping down.

After this result, Musk responded "interesting" to unfounded theories that the result of the resignation poll had been influenced by bots, agreeing with a user's suggestion to restrict future polls on policy changes to paid Twitter Blue subscribers. On December 20, he announced he would step down as CEO as soon as his replacement was selected, but would continue to lead Twitter's software and server teams. On April 11, 2023, he joked to the BBC that he had appointed his dog as CEO.

On May 11, 2023, Musk announced he had found a person to succeed him in the CEO position; the following day, he named Linda Yaccarino, former head of ad sales for NBCUniversal, to succeed him as CEO.

=== Corporate value ===
One year after the Musk acquisition, company documents related to employee restricted stock grants showed the company had estimated its own valuation at about $19 billion, down about 55% from Musk's purchase price. A lower estimate was reported in October 2023 from Fidelity at about the same time, estimating the company to be down 65% from its purchase price. Fidelity estimated in October 2024 that the company's value was down 79% from Musk's original purchase price, 24% lower than what Fidelity had estimated two months earlier. In February 2025, Musk was reportedly in talks for a new round of financing at a $44 billion valuation, thus returning to the valuation at the time of purchase.

=== Fines ===
In August 2023, X was fined US$350,000 for failing to meet two deadlines to comply with a U.S. Department of Justice search warrant for the account of former president Donald Trump. In October 2024, the Supreme Court declined to hear X's appeal. In October 2023, X was fined AU$610,500 by Australia's e-Safety Commission for failing to properly disclose information about how it polices child abuse content. As of 2023 other fines were being considered.

== Appearance and features ==
=== Posts ===
Posts are publicly visible by default, but senders can restrict message delivery to only their followers. Users can mute users they do not wish to interact with, block accounts from viewing their posts, and remove accounts from their followers list. Users can post via the X website, compatible external applications (such as for smartphones), or by Short Message Service (SMS) available in certain countries. Users may subscribe to other users' posts—this is known as "following" and subscribers are known as "followers". Individual posts can be forwarded by other users to their own feed, a process known as a "repost". Users can also "quote", a feature that allows users to add a comment to their post, imbedding one post in the other. Users can also "like" individual posts.

Users can group posts together by topic or type by use of hashtags – words or phrases prefixed with a "#" sign. Similarly, the "@" sign followed by a username is used for mentioning or replying to other users. Hashflags are special hashtags that automatically generate a custom emoji next to them for a certain period of time. Hashflags may be generated by X themselves or be purchased by corporations. Users can reply to other accounts' replies. Users can hide replies to their messages and select who can reply to each of their posts before sending them: anyone, accounts the poster followed, verified accounts, or specific accounts.

=== X Hiring ===
X offers a job search feature named X Hiring, where users can search jobs by keyword or location, and they may filter the results by location type, seniority, employment type and company. Users can also get personalized job recommendations on their timeline.

=== Grok ===
Grok is a generative AI chatbot developed by xAI, and integrated inside X. It has direct access to X data, and is available for Premium and Premium+ subscribers. Grok is also used to power the Stories feature, which summarizes posts on X associated with each trending story. Stories are visible under the For You tab of the Explore section.

=== X Premium ===
X offers three tiers of paid subscription for individual users, namely X Premium, which provides additional functionality compared to the free tier. The three tiers are Basic, Premium, and Premium+. Additionally, X offers a paid subscription for businesses, non-profits, and governments called Verified Organization, which provides additional functionality beyond the Premium+ tier.

Basic

This is the entry-level subscription tier for the social media platform X. Priced at $3 per month or $32 per year, it offers several enhancements over the free version, aimed at improving user experience. Basic tier allows users to edit posts within 30 minutes of posting and retract a post shortly after sending it, before it is widely seen. It enables users to write posts up to 25,000 characters, bypassing the 280-character limit, and to upload videos up to three hours long and 8 GB in size on the X website and iOS app. Users can also download videos posted on X, play videos in the background while using other features, and apply bold or italic formatting to text in posts. Additionally, Basic tier provides organizational tools such as bookmark folders, access to the most shared articles from followed accounts, and a reader mode for simplified reading of long conversation threads. Subscribers can also customize the X app icon on their mobile devices, create communities based on shared interests, and enjoy prioritized replies over non-subscribers.

Premium

This is the mid-tier subscription, costing $8 per month or $84 per year. It includes all Basic tier features plus additional benefits aimed at enhanced user engagement and monetization. Premium subscribers can earn a share of ad revenue based on the engagement their posts receive and set up creator subscriptions to receive monthly payments from top followers, sharing revenue generated by X. They also gain access to Media Studio for managing and measuring content performance, X Pro for managing multiple timelines and accounts from a single interface and Grok, an AI-powered chatbot for information and inquiries. Premium subscribers see half the ads compared to Basic subscribers and non-subscribers and receive a verification checkmark next to their name, with the option to hide it. Replies from Premium subscribers are prioritized higher than those from Basic subscribers.

Premium+

This is the top-tier subscription, priced at $22 per month or $229 per year. It includes all features from Basic and Premium tiers, along with exclusive benefits. Premium+ subscribers have no advertisements on the site. They can directly post articles with formatting, and their replies receive the highest prioritization over other tiers.

Verified Organizations

It offers a premium subscription service for businesses, non-profits and governments with two plans: Basic and Full Access. The Basic plan, available for $200 per month or $2,000 per year, includes a gold checkmark, priority support, X Premium+ features, and a limited-time advertising credit of $2,400 per year or $200 per month. The Full Access plan, priced at $1,000 per month or $10,000 per year, includes all the Basic plan features plus increased reach, affiliations, and a limited-time advertising credit of $12,000 per year or $1,000 per month.

=== X Money Account ===
In January 2025, X announced plans to introduce an "X Money Account" feature later in the year. The feature which would function as a digital wallet allowing real-time payments on the social media platform and moving funds to and from traditional bank accounts. Visa was announced as partnering with X on the project and, at least initially, cryptocurrencies would not be supported.

== Content moderation ==
Avatar of Elon Musk

Elon Musk
(@elonmusk)
tweeted:

Twitter will be forming a content moderation council with widely diverse viewpoints.
No major content decisions or account reinstatements will happen before that council convenes.

October 28, 2022

=== Initial reforms ===
On October 28, 2022, Musk announced that a "content moderation council" with diversified viewpoints would be established to inform the platform's "content policy", and declared a moratorium in "major content decisions or account reinstatements" until then. The council was never formed; Musk claimed that it had been part of a deal made with activists who had failed to honor it. He also signaled an intention to do away with lifetime account suspensions and unban those suspended for "minor [or] dubious reasons". Musk later stated that he would not alter Twitter's content policies or restore banned accounts until after the midterm elections.

In June 2023, Musk defended the approach to content moderation as "freedom of speech, not freedom of reach", but went against his own policies, restricting the use of the terms "cis" and "cisgender" arguing that they are slurs, and describing the platform as having liberal bias. In September 2023, X subsequently scrapped the feature for users to report misleading posts, instead relying exclusively on Community Notes to combat misinformation on the platform.

=== Handling of misinformation and disinformation ===
In November 2022, Twitter announced it would no longer enforce its policy prohibiting COVID-19 misinformation. Algorithm changes promoted viral disinformation about the Russian invasion of Ukraine, and led to significant gains in followers for media outlets affiliated with Russia, China and Iran. Twitter, like Meta, Twitch, and Alphabet, laid off a significant portion of its content moderators in 2023.

As of September 2023, X relied exclusively on its Community Notes program to combat misinformation, leading to failures in labeling misinformation. The program has become responsible for spreading misinformation as well as delays in fact-checking. A European Commission study found that disinformation was most prevalent and received the highest relative engagement on X, compared to other major social networks, leading to warnings of a potential ban or fines by the EU for non-compliance with the Digital Services Act.

In October 2023, media outlets and experts observed significant disinformation related to the war in Gaza. A BBC journalist described a "deluge" of false information, including by "blue tick" accounts, and CNBC found that while some videos were flagged as "misleading or false", identical re-posts remained unflagged. Despite Hamas being banned on Twitter as a terrorist organization, some of its propaganda videos have circulated on the platform.

An analysis from NewsGuard found that Verified users, described as "superspreaders of misinformation", produced 74% of the most viral misinformation related to the Gaza war during the first week of the conflict. The study analyzed 250 of the most-engaged posts on Twitter, based on the most popular false or unsubstantiated claims, that had received over 100 million views and one million engagements from users. On December 18, 2023, the European Union announced it would be taking action against X over the spread of disinformation.

In August 2024, several Labour MPs in the United Kingdom reduced their use of Twitter or left the platform due to concerns about misinformation and hate speech under Musk's ownership. Some explored alternatives like Threads and Bluesky, while the British government continued to use X, focusing on implementing stronger online safety regulations.

=== Increase in hate speech ===
Following Musk's acquisition of Twitter, multiple organizations reported a rise in hate speech on the platform, including the Center for Countering Digital Hate (CCDH), the Anti-Defamation League, and a research group at Tufts University. The CCDH report found that anti-Black slurs appeared on Twitter at nearly three times the rate they had prior to the acquisition and that homophobic and transphobic slurs had risen by 52% and 62% respectively. Academics and researchers studied the spread of hate speech on Twitter primarily by accessing the Twitter API, which was shut down in February 2023. According to a Reuters survey, this removal led to the modification or cancellation of more than 100 ongoing studies.

According to the Institute of Strategic Dialogue (ISD), from June 2022 to February 2023, the number of anti-semitic tweets doubled on the platform, with removal of such content also increasing, while the number of Islamic State accounts had also increased by 70%. A further showed that in the period up to June 2023, the weekly rate of hate speech was approximately 50% higher than when Musk took over, and the number of likes received by hate posts had doubled. In March, a study from the BBC found a third of the 1,100 reinstated accounts appeared to have violated Twitter guidelines. Twitter insiders told BBC Panorama they were struggling to protect users from trolling and harassment, including misogynistic online hate, and the targeting of rape survivors.

From a study of over 1 million tweets since 2022, the CCDH reported that posts associating LGBT people with "grooming" increased by 119 percent since October 2022, with advertising also appearing alongside what many deemed anti-LGBT rhetoric. The study featured five high-profile accounts including Libs of TikTok, Christopher Rufo, Tim Pool, and James Lindsay. Media monitoring group GLAAD described Twitter as "the most dangerous platform for LGBTQ people" with X ranking lowest on its Social Media Safety Index.

In November 2023, the CCDH released a new report claiming 98% of misinformation, antisemitism, Islamophobia, and other hate speech, in relation to the Gaza war, remained on X after 7 days of reporting, generating over 24 million views. X responded by detailing the removal of 3,000 accounts and taking action against 325,000 pieces of content, such as restricting the reach of a post. On November 24, the European Union halted advertisements on X referring to an "alarming increase" in hate speech and misinformation. A spokesperson for the European Commission confirmed that X is affected by the EU rules, and has advised European institutions to abstain from advertising on the platform.

Following the Dublin riots in Ireland on November 23, 2023, X faced criticism for allowing "vile messages" on the platform, described as hate speech, while other social media platforms, TikTok, Instagram, and Facebook, complied with Garda requests for taking down content. After Prime Minister Leo Varadkar called for incitement to hatred legislation to be updated, Musk responded by stating "the Irish PM hates the Irish people".

=== Child pornography ===
In August 2023, it was reported that child pornography on X was still an issue, despite statements by Musk that removing it was a top priority. As of June 2023, an investigation by the Stanford Internet Observatory at Stanford University reported "a lapse in basic enforcement" against child porn by Twitter within "recent months". The number of staff on Twitter's trust and safety teams were reduced, for example, leaving one full-time staffer to handle all child sexual abuse material in the Asia-Pacific region in November 2022. A 2023 investigation by BBC Panorama found concerns that child sexual abuse was rising, following the layoffs and changes at Twitter since Musk's takeover.

According to the Australian Financial Review, the Australian government's eSafety Commission reported in March 2023 that, since Musk's acquisition of the platform, "the proactive detection of child sexual exploitation material [on Twitter] fell from 90 per cent to 75 per cent." In 2024, the company unsuccessfully attempted to avoid the imposition of fines in Australia regarding the government's inquiries about child safety enforcement; X Corp reportedly said they had no obligation to respond to the inquiries since they were addressed to "Twitter Inc", which X Corp argued had "ceased to exist".

Musk was criticized in July 2023 for intervening to unban political influencer "Dom Lucre". Lucre had, according to Forbes, "posted a screenshot of a video depicting child sexual abuse on July 22 reportedly connected to Peter Scully, an Australian man sentenced to life in prison for sexually abusing children as young as 18 months, whose video was reportedly created on the dark web." The Washington Post reported that the Twitter post by Lucre was viewed 3 million times, and was "an image of a toddler being tortured." Musk stated the platform would "delete those posts and reinstate the account." In June 2024, Musk posted that a separate account had "posted a picture of that poor kid in Afghanistan being sodomized with a stick" and "will be restored soon."

In June 2025, NBC reported about the status of child protection on X (Twitter under Musk) as of that date. The report stated: "Many aspects of the child exploitation ads issue, which NBC News first reported on in January 2023, remain the same on the platform. Sellers of child sexual abuse material (CSAM) continue to use hashtags based on sexual keywords to advertise to people looking to buy CSAM." Lloyd Richardson, of the Canadian Centre for Child Protection, said the platform's response "has been woefully insufficient". The child protection organization Thorn stated: "We recently terminated our contract with X due to nonpayment. And that was after months and months of outreach, flexibility, trying to make it work. And ultimately we had to stop the contract."

BBC News reported in August 2025 that they had discovered a network of "more than 100" accounts openly selling child pornography on X, and that a victim of the "child sexual abuse has begged Elon Musk to stop links offering images of her abuse being posted on his social media platform X."

=== Malicious and fake accounts ===
In March 2024, The Intelligencer reported on the proliferation of spam posts containing the phrase "░P░U░S░S░Y░I░N░B░I░O░", or similar references to pornographic content appearing in the poster's bio, apparently formatted so as to evade counter-spam measures. The commonality of "pussy in bio" or "PIB" spam made it fodder for internet memes, including one posted by Elon Musk himself. The Intelligencer further noted that most of the accounts that posted this spam were short-lived throwaway accounts, and that links provided by the accounts typically routed users through several layers of redirecting websites, ultimately landing on a provider of simulated sex chats. Musk made several statements about his intention to disable such bots on X, but eventually conceded that "Fighting bot and troll farms is hard", because of their tactics evolve alongside those of platforms trying to stop them.

== Policy changes ==
Avatar of Elon Musk

Elon Musk
(@elonmusk)
tweeted:

New Twitter policy is freedom of speech, but not freedom of reach.
Negative/hate tweets will be max deboosted & demonetized, so no ads or other revenue to Twitter.
You won't find the tweet unless you specifically seek it out, which is no different from rest of Internet.

November 18, 2022

In December 2022, Twitter dissolved the Trust and Safety Council responsible for Twitter's policies on hate speech, child sexual exploitation, and self-harm content. This occurred while evidence showed an increase in hate speech following Musk's acquisition. The new head of Trust and Safety, Ella Irwin, announced that Twitter had moved towards more automation to moderate content, in order to restrict diffusion, later described by Musk as "freedom of speech, not freedom of reach".

Twitter adopted an updated zero-tolerance policy on "violent speech" on February 28, 2023, described by The Verge as both "more specific and more vague" than the prior version. As of April 2023 there was no evidence of policy changes that had decreased the overall number of bots, although there was some evidence that spambots had decreased slightly.

=== Account suspensions and reinstatements ===
Within hours of the takeover in October 2022, the far-right Britain First account, previously banned in 2017, was reinstated. Account bans continued to be lifted in late November 2022, beginning with Jordan Peterson, Kathy Griffin, The Babylon Bee, and Donald Trump. Multiple accounts were suspended, many of which had been named by far-right figures who urged Musk to take action. Among those banned include a group that provided security to LGBTQ+ events, and several accounts parodying Musk. Twitter has also suspended the accounts of Musk/Tesla critic Aaron Greenspan and his legal transparency company PlainSite, and several journalists and left-leaning accounts, including Ken Klippenstein.

In November, Twitter analytics firm Bot Sentinel calculated that around 877,000 accounts were deactivated and 497,000 were suspended between October 28 and November 1, over double the usual number. In December, neo-Nazi and founder of The Daily Stormer Andrew Anglin was reinstated, within 24 hours of Kanye West's suspension after posting an antisemitic tweet. West's account was later restored in July 2023.

In August 2024, Alexandre de Moraes, a Brazilian Supreme Court judge, cautioned that X might face suspension if Musk did not appoint a new legal representative for Brazil within 24 hours, in relation to issues over the reinstatement of Brazilian accounts that had been suspended under a court order. Musk had earlier paused X's business operations in the country and criticized Judge Alexandre de Moraes for his efforts against disinformation. The platform was temporarily suspended in Brazil in late August 2024; it was restored in October after X blocked the accounts as ordered.

==== ElonJet and journalists suspended ====
Avatar of Elon Musk

Elon Musk
(@elonmusk)
tweeted:

Any account doxxing real-time location info of anyone will be suspended, as it is a physical safety violation. This includes posting links to sites with real-time location info. Posting locations someone traveled to on a slightly delayed basis isn't a safety problem, so is ok.

December 15, 2022

On December 14, Musk suspended ElonJet, a Twitter bot account operated by Jack Sweeney which tracked Musk's private jet in real-time using publicly accessible data, in addition to several of Sweeney's other accounts. He had previously stated, "My commitment to free speech extends even to not banning the account following my plane, even though that is a direct personal safety risk." Defending his decision to suspend the accounts, Musk declared a ban on doxxing real-time location data, and Twitter followed suit by updating its policies page.

The next day, Twitter banned the accounts of multiple journalists who had been covering the ElonJet incident, as well as the Mastodon account on Twitter, on the grounds that they had violated the new doxing policy. Some of the suspended journalists joined a Twitter Spaces mass audio call with Musk, where Musk was asked about their suspensions; Musk quit the call, and the call was abruptly ended before the entire Twitter Spaces service was temporarily taken down. Musk attributed the shutdown to a software bug, while a Twitter senior software engineer said that Spaces had been "taken offline". Most suspended journalists were later reinstated, but found themselves unable to post new tweets until their policy-violating tweets had been taken down.

=== State-affiliated media labeling ===
In April 2023, Twitter designated National Public Radio's main account as "US state-affiliated media", a label that was typically reserved for foreign media outlets that directly represented the point of view of their respective governments, like Russia's RT and China's Xinhua. Twitter's decision was controversial; though established by an act of Congress, NPR is an independent news organization that only receives a fraction of its funding through government programs. Twitter's previous policy had explicitly mentioned NPR, as well as the United Kingdom's BBC, as examples of networks that were not considered state-affiliated due to their editorial independence. NPR ceased activity on its main Twitter account in response to the designation. As of October 2023, NPR still no longer uses X, with the media outlet describing the effects on traffic as negligible.

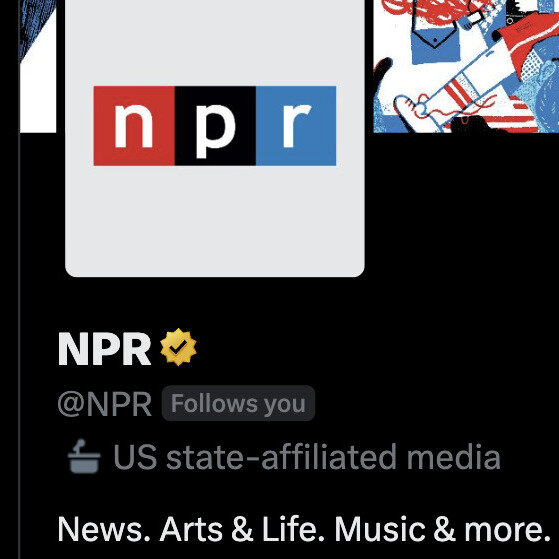
NPR labeled state-affiliated media

On April 8, 2023, Twitter changed the designation of NPR's account from "state-affiliated" to "government-funded". On April 10, after managing to get in contact with Musk himself, NPR reporter Bobby Allyn tweeted that Musk said he was relying on a list accessible through a Wikipedia category page, named "Category:Publicly funded broadcasters", to determine which news organizations' accounts should be deemed as "government-funded media". Twitter then added the label to other sources such as PBS, the BBC, and Voice of America, which all three objected to.

On April 12, NPR announced that its accounts would no longer be active on Twitter, citing the platform's "inaccurate and misleading" labeling of NPR as "government-funded media" despite the fact that it receives "less than 1 percent of its $300 million annual budget" from the Corporation for Public Broadcasting. As their last post on the platform, the network shared links to their alternative newsletters, websites and social media profiles. In an email to the staff explaining the decision, CEO John Lansing allowed individual NPR journalists and staffers to choose for themselves whether to keep using Twitter, while noting that remaining on the site "would be a disservice to the serious work you all do here".

On April 17, Canadian public broadcaster CBC was designated as "government-funded media" by Twitter, in response to a letter from Conservative Party of Canada leader Pierre Poilievre. On April 18, the label was changed to "70% government-funded media", referring to outdated data from the CBC's 2020–2021 report; shortly afterwards, Musk tweaked the percentage in the label to "69%" as a reference to the sex position. Musk tweeted "Canadian Broadcasting Corp said they're 'less than 70% government-funded', so we corrected the label". In response, CBC announced they would pause Twitter activity. Four days later, Twitter stopped labeling state-affiliated media entirely, with neither Western publicly funded outlets such as NPR, BBC and CBC, nor China's Xinhua and Russia's RT, displaying the label on their accounts.

=== Hateful conduct and language regarding transgender people ===
Avatar of Elon Musk

Elon Musk
(@elonmusk)
tweeted:

Repeated, targeted harassment against any account will cause the harassing accounts to receive, at minimum, temporary suspensions.
The words "cis" or "cisgender" are considered slurs on this platform.

June 21, 2023

After previously indicating his intention to review Twitter's policy against "misgendering or deadnaming of transgender individuals", Musk relaxed the platform's hate speech policies in November 2022, with Gizmodo describing the policy protecting transgender people as "effectively dead". While previously tweets would be removed, Twitter announced it would instead place warning labels on tweets that are "potentially" in violation of its hateful conduct policy in April 2023.

In June, on the first day of Pride Month, Musk confirmed that a policy against misgendering wouldn't be enforced, and that in his opinion "Whether or not you agree with using someone's preferred pronouns, not doing so is at most rude and certainly breaks no laws". He also promoted the film What Is a Woman? by The Daily Wire, after a Twitter review determined the content promoted hateful conduct, and was therefore in violation of abuse and harassment policies. Musk claimed the objection to the film was "a mistake", but that it wouldn't be promoted across the platform. After a pressure campaign from users, the restrictions were reduced to simply not being placed next to advertising. Shortly after, Musk declared that the words "cis" and "cisgender" are considered slurs on Twitter, within the context of repeated and targeted harassment. In October, the ability to report allegations of transphobic abuse had been scrapped.

In November, PragerU bought a "timeline takeover" advertising spot, which forces an advertisement and accompanying hashtag to be seen by most Twitter users regardless of demographics or preferences for 24 hours, to promote their short film Detrans: The Dangers of Gender-Affirming Care; the "timeline takeover" spot was part of PragerU's estimated $1 million marketing budget for the short film. The Nation describes "anti-trans hatred" as one of Twitter's "core features".

=== Monetization and access restrictions ===
In January 2023, Twitter abruptly cut off many third-party Twitter clients from the site's application programming interface (API), and had retroactively updated its developer agreement, barring developers from creating products similar to Twitter's own app. In February, Twitter announced it would be removing the free tier of its API and replacing it with a "basic paid tier", while excluding "good content" bot accounts.

Avatar of Elon Musk

Elon Musk
(@elonmusk)
tweeted:

To address extreme levels of data scraping & system manipulation, we've applied the following temporary limits:

- Verified accounts are limited to reading 6000 posts/day
- Unverified accounts to 600 posts/day

- New unverified accounts to 300/day

July 1, 2023

In July 2023, Twitter temporarily blocked unregistered users from viewing tweets or profiles. The following day further measures were implemented with temporary limits to the number of tweets a user could see per day, with different limits for verified and unverified users, as well as newly created users, and thousands of users reported Twitter issues to the website Downdetector. Soon after, the limit was increased again. Twitter also limited the number of direct messages (DMs) that unverified users could send per day.

Avatar of Elon Musk

Elon Musk
(@elonmusk)
tweeted:

Block is going to be deleted as a "feature", except for DMs

August 18, 2023

In October 2023, X began charging new users in New Zealand and the Philippines an annual fee of $1 in order to use basic features such as posting, replying and quoting tweets, as part of a pilot program.

Avatar of Elon Musk

Elon Musk
(@elonmusk)
tweeted:

Unfortunately, a small fee for new user write access is the only way to curb the relentless onslaught of bots. Current AI (and troll farms) can pass "are you a bot" with ease.

Apr 15, 2024

In January 2024 Nitter privacy-friendly alternative frontend had to be declared as "dead" by the project leader. On 24 August 2026, a cease and desist was sent to Nitter and its instances by X Corp, accusing Nitter of scraping and demanding a permanent takedown of Nitter instances and the project's repository. The developer is seeking legal advice, and stated that "development has stopped for the time being" and the XCancel instance announced that it was offline "until further notice". On 25 August 2026, Nitter's GitHub project was archived. On 6 September 2026, it was announced that the Nitter project would continue. One day later, the XCancel site was the first Nitter instance to come back online again. However, on 11 September, Nitter's GitHub project was archived again, and on 14 September, XCancel announced it was offline again until further notice. The main Nitter website is offline.

=== Miscellaneous ===
In August 2023, Musk proposed deleting the "Block" feature, with the exception of direct messaging, instead replacing it with a stronger version of "Mute". In response to backlash received from anti-bullying activists for removing the feature, chief executive Linda Yaccarino confirmed the changes, with concern that if removed X would violate the App Store and Google Play Store policies. That same month, analysis from The Washington Post found that X was delaying links to external social media sites such as those owned by Meta Platforms, Substack, Bluesky, as well as Reuters and The New York Times, all companies that Musk has had grudges with. The Washington Post found that users were made to wait approximately five seconds before the links loaded. They also claimed that the New York Times had seen a drop in user traffic. A few hours after the story was first published, X started reversing this delay. Later that month, Fortune reported that Musk was planning to remove headlines and other text from news articles posted on Twitter, with the change taking effect in October 2024.

In November 2023, Musk declared on X that users who use the phrases "decolonization" and "from the river to the sea", commonly used by activists calling for a Palestinian state, as well as "similar euphemisms", would be suspended. According to Musk, the phrases imply genocide of Jewish people, as well as "clear calls for extreme violence", against the terms of service of the platform. The announcement was welcomed by ADL director Jonathan Greenblatt.

Avatar of Elon Musk

Elon Musk
(@elonmusk)
tweeted:

As I said earlier this week, "decolonization", "from the river to the sea" and similar euphemisms necessarily imply genocide. Clear calls for extreme violence are against our terms of service and will result in suspension.

Nov 17, 2023

In March 2024, antifascists published materials claiming to reveal the identity of the pseudonymous neo-Nazi cartoonist StoneToss. He sought help from Musk; X then suspended multiple users who included StoneToss' alleged real name in their posts, and amended its privacy policy to prohibit disclosure of others' real names. The following month, Musk announced that new users would soon have to pay in order to post, intended to combat the "onslaught of bots". In June 2024, X made likes private, allowing only post authors to see who liked their posts. This decision sparked mixed reactions, with some users protesting by responding to posts they liked with images of the "Yeah!" button from Nintendo's discontinued Miiverse social network.

In October 2024, an analysis by The Wall Street Journal found the "For You" section to be highly politicized for new accounts with twice as much pro-Trump content than pro-Harris. X also announced that the block function would be changed to allow blocked accounts to view public posts, but not interact with said posts, and regardless of consent, posts would be used to train generative AI.

== Changes to the algorithm ==
=== "For You" feed ===
Under Elon Musk, Twitter's "Newsfeed" tab was split into two new tabs: "For You" and "Following". While the latter, like "Newsfeed", only displays activity from accounts followed by the user, "For You" displays an algorithmically curated feed similar to that of TikTok. With a paid subscription to Twitter Blue, users can have their tweets boosted by this algorithm. This change was blamed for a rise in disinformation on the platform, with some paying accounts being used to spread fake news, notably pro-Kremlin propaganda related to the Russo-Ukrainian War.

=== Promotion of Elon Musk's tweets ===
On February 7, 2023, Elon Musk convened a meeting of Twitter engineers and advisors to address the decline in engagement with his own tweets. One of the company's two principal engineers, after suggesting that public interest in Musk was waning following a peak during his acquisition of the platform, was fired. A Google Trends chart presented by employees had shown a decline in popularity. The following week, after the Super Bowl LVII, Twitter employee James Musk, who is Elon's paternal cousin, sent a message to the company's engineers concerning a "high urgency" matter: that Elon Musk's tweet about the Super Bowl had received less impressions than one sent by US president Joe Biden. By that afternoon, Twitter's algorithm had been altered to artificially boost Musk's tweets by a factor of 1,000. Many users observed an overwhelming promotion of his posts in the "For You" tab. Following criticism, the boost was lessened to a smaller factor.

=== Promotion of state-controlled media ===
On April 6, 2023, Twitter reversed its official policy stating that the platform would not "recommend or amplify" the content of state-controlled media entities. According to an analysis by the Digital Forensic Research Lab, the change had already taken effect since around March 29, when Twitter stopped filtering government accounts in Russia, China and Iran. These accounts, such as those managed by Russia's RT, have a significant presence on the platform. Following the change, which enabled the accounts to be algorithmically promoted by Twitter, their follower count quickly rose.

=== Promotion of conservative content ===
A computational analysis published on November 1, 2024, found potential algorithmic bias on X in favor of Republican Party supporters. The study, which looked at more than 56,000 posts, identified a system-wide "structural break" on the platform around July 13, 2024, a date which coincides with Elon Musk's endorsement of Donald Trump in the 2024 US presidential election. From that point on, Elon Musk and other Republican commentators saw increased visibility for their posts. According to the researchers behind the study, this "could imply an algorithmic adjustment". On January 17, 2025, the European Commission requested to see X's internal documentation about its algorithms "and any recent changes made to it", following accusations of manipulation benefitting far-right viewpoints.

== Major developments ==
=== Verification ===
Badge for verified organizations

Badge for government accounts

On November 5, 2022, Twitter required users to purchase a Twitter Blue subscription to indicate they were "verified" on the platform, which was then delayed until after the U.S. midterm elections due to concerns of potential election interference. Twitter's Trust and Safety team assessed the potential for impersonation of official accounts and increasing the credibility of scammers with their highest risk categorization.

On November 9, one day after the United States Election Day, Twitter launched its revamped verification program on iOS devices for all users. To distinguish between those who had been verified before the change and those who received the checkmark via Twitter Blue, users had to click on the checkmark icon. Twitter then halted new verifications via Twitter Blue amid a spike in impersonator accounts, before relaunching the program on December 12, with gold checkmarks for businesses and gray checkmarks for government accounts. Musk also met with advertisers via Twitter Spaces to outline his plans to fulfill his pre-acquisition pledges, previewing forthcoming features and allaying fears of a rise in disinformation and hate speech, referencing the crowd-sourced Community Notes program.

On March 23, 2023, Twitter announced that "legacy" verification badges would be removed starting on April 1. The date passed with no change, before Twitter announced that the removal date for checkmarks from non-paying accounts would be April 20, with the only way to acquire a blue checkmark through the paid subscription. Around late April, the remaining "legacy" badges were removed, and only those subscribed to Twitter Blue remained. Several notable users, however, reported having the blue check mark without having paid for it nor wanting it, such as writer Stephen King and actor Jason Alexander.

=== Twitter Files ===
The Twitter Files are a series of internal documents from Twitter, Inc. released between December 2022 and March 2023. After acquiring Twitter on October 28, 2022, CEO Elon Musk provided these documents to journalists Matt Taibbi, Bari Weiss, Lee Fang, and authors Michael Shellenberger, David Zweig, and Alex Berenson. Taibbi and Weiss, in coordination with Musk, published the details of the files through a series of Twitter threads. After the initial release, some technology and media journalists observed that the documents mainly showed Twitter's policy team handling difficult decisions effectively. In contrast, some conservatives argued the documents revealed a liberal bias within Twitter.

=== Dispute with ADL ===
Avatar of Elon Musk

Elon Musk
(@elonmusk)
tweeted:

Our US advertising revenue is still down 60%, primarily due to pressure on advertisers by

@ADL

(that's what advertisers tell us), so they almost succeeded in killing X/Twitter!

Sep 4, 2023

In August 2023, a community note falsely accusing Jewish lynching victim Leo Frank of raping and murdering a 13-year-old girl repeatedly appeared on tweets by the Anti-Defamation League (ADL) and ADL CEO Jonathan Greenblatt. Neo-Nazi trolls created the note and cited white supremacist websites purporting to substantiate the note's claims. The Times of Israel characterized the note's appearance as part of a pattern of Twitter's features rewarding antisemites. Later that month, Greenblatt and Twitter CEO Linda Yaccarino had a dialogue about addressing hate speech on the platform. Both parties tweeted about it, sparking a backlash from many right-wing users, who accused the ADL of censorship and bias and launched a "#BanTheADL" hashtag campaign, which trended on the site. In the wake of this, Twitter users reported seeing a tweet promoted by Twitter's ad platform containing the white supremacist slogan known as the "fourteen words". Days later, Musk threatened to sue the ADL, blaming the organization for billions of dollars in lost revenue.

Avatar of Elon Musk

Elon Musk
(@elonmusk)
tweeted:

You have said the actual truth

Nov 15, 2023

In November 2023, Musk replied to an antisemitic tweet which supported the white genocide conspiracy theory and accused Jews of "pushing the exact kind of dialectical hatred against whites that they claim to want people to stop using against them". Musk responded that the tweet "said the actual truth". Following this reply, Musk wrote that it was "super messed-up" that white people are not "allowed to be proud of their race". Two days later, after the ADL had condemned Musk's tweet describing it as "indisputably dangerous", the White House issued a statement with Joe Biden condemning Musk, proclaiming "we condemn this abhorrent promotion of antisemitic and racist hate in the strongest terms".

If somebody is going to try to blackmail me with advertising, blackmail me with money, go fuck yourself. Go fuck yourself. Is that clear? I hope it is

— Elon Musk, November 29, 2023

At the DealBook Summit later that month, journalist Andrew Ross Sorkin questioned Musk about the withdrawal of advertisers from X following his recent posts. Musk said in response, "I hope they stop. Don't advertise", and told advertisers to "go fuck yourself". Musk mentioned Bob Iger, the CEO of the Walt Disney Company, which had stopped advertising on X; Musk also said that if X fails, it would be "because of an advertiser boycott. And that will be what bankrupts the company." He later called for Iger to be fired from Disney.

== Lawsuits ==
=== Center for Countering Digital Hate ===
Sometimes it is unclear what is driving a litigation, and only by reading between the lines of a complaint can one attempt to surmise a plaintiff's true purpose, [...] Other times, a complaint is so unabashedly and vociferously about one thing that there can be no mistaking that purpose. This case represents the latter circumstance. This case is about punishing the defendants for their speech.

— Judge Charles Breyer, March 25, 2024,

In July 2023, at the suggestion of Yaccarino, X Corp sued the Center for Countering Digital Hate (CCDH) over their research that suggested Twitter fails to act on 99% of hate content from Twitter Blue subscribers, accusing the group of "inflammatory, outrageous, and false or misleading assertions about Twitter". The online watchdog said the lawsuit was "riddled with legal deficiencies" and in November 2023 filed for dismissal. The nonprofit group also argued it was an intimidation attempt, as well as an attempt to stifle their First Amendment protected speech. According to a Coalition for Independent Technology Research survey carried out for Reuters, the majority of researchers surveyed fear they would be sued for studying the platform since the CCDH lawsuit. On March 25, 2024, Judge Charles Breyer dismissed the lawsuit in accordance with anti-SLAPP laws, having described parts of the case as the "most vapid extensions of law that I've ever heard". The decision was welcomed by the CEO of the CCDH, Imran Ahmed.

=== Media Matters ===
On November 16, 2023, Media Matters published analysis indicating Twitter was placing major client advertisements next to user posts containing antisemitic content, including praise for Adolf Hitler and Nazis. Several prominent companies subsequently suspended their advertising on the platform, including; IBM, Apple, Lionsgate, Disney, Paramount, Comcast, Warner Bros. Discovery, Sony, Walmart, Coca-Cola, Uber, Airbnb, Ubisoft, Expedia, Fox Sports, and Netflix. The New York Times estimated the potential revenue loss to be up to $75 million.

Avatar of Elon Musk

Elon Musk
(@elonmusk)
tweeted:

The split second court opens on Monday, X Corp will be filing a thermonuclear lawsuit against Media Matters and ALL those who colluded in this fraudulent attack on our company

Nov 18, 2023

Musk announced that X Corp would file "a thermonuclear lawsuit" against Media Matters and affiliated parties, and called for the journalists to be jailed. On November 20, 2023, X Corp filed a complaint naming Media Matters as defendant. Texas Attorney General Ken Paxton announced an investigation into Media Matters for potential fraud, referring to it as a "radical anti-free speech organization".

Although tough talk is not foreign to the law enforcement arena, such overt political messaging is atypical. A reasonable factfinder is likely to interpret Defendants' words as targeting Media Matters not for legitimate law enforcement purposes but instead for its protected First Amendment activities.

— Judge Amit P. Mehta, August 26, 2024

On June 13, 2024, a U.S. District judge ordered that X Corp's lawsuit against Media Matters will proceed to trial on April 7, 2025. The judge, Reed O'Connor, owns Tesla stock and chose not to recuse. In August, he ruled against Media Matters' request that the case be dismissed. Legal experts have criticized Musk's lawsuit, deeming it "frivolous" or "bogus", and saying that it contradicts the First Amendment. In December 2023, Missouri Attorney General Andrew Bailey opened a similar investigation into Media Matters. In August 2024, a federal judge granted an injunction to halt the Missouri investigation, saying the suit was using law enforcement machinery for political ends against Media Matters.

In May 2025, the FTC issued a civil investigative demand (CID) letter to Media Matters, seeking information on its contacts with a World Federation of Advertisers and others regarding the dropping of ads after the Media Matters report. In August 2025, a federal judge halted the FTC's investigation into Media Matters saying that Media Matters had “engaged in quintessential First Amendment activity" when it published the report on placement of ads near antisemitic material and that “It should alarm all Americans when the Government retaliates against individuals or organizations for engaging in constitutionally protected public debate. And that alarm should ring even louder when the Government retaliates against those engaged in newsgathering and reporting.” He also found that Media Matters was likely to show that the FTC had acted with "retaliatory animus". However, because of the cost of defending itself, Media Matters laid off personnel.

In April 2026, the FTC dropped its investigation into Media Matters and in May Media Matters withdrew its suit against the FTC.

=== Advertisers ===
On August 6, 2024, X filed an anti-trust lawsuit in the Northern District of Texas against the World Federation of Advertisers, Unilever, Mars, CVS and Ørsted, alleging that the advertisers had conspired via their participation in the Global Alliance for Responsible Media (GARM) to withhold "billions of dollars in advertising revenue" from X. The World Federation of Advertisers created GARM in 2019, with the group shutting down days after the lawsuit was initiated. In February 2025, the Texas lawsuit was broadened to include Lego, Nestlé, Tyson Foods, Abbott Laboratories, Colgate-Palmolive, Pinterest and Shell International, as advertisers previously part of the discontinued GARM group. In May, some of the advertisers requested the case be dismissed stating that "antitrust law protects competition; it does not protect X from competition". In March 2026, X's lawsuit was dismissed with prejudice.

== Reactions and commentary ==
Commentators have described Twitter under Musk's ownership as a "free speech free-for-all", "free-for-all hellscape", and as a right-wing social network. The platform garnered favorable attention from conservatives and Republicans in the United States.

=== 2022 ===
Avatar of Ed Markey

Ed Markey
(@SenMarkey)
tweeted:

One of your companies is under an FTC consent decree. Auto safety watchdog NHTSA is investigating another for killing people. And you're spending your time picking fights online. Fix your companies. Or Congress will.

November 13, 2022

In November 2022, author Stephen King, U.S. representative Alexandria Ocasio-Cortez, and U.S. senator Ed Markey criticized Musk's decision to charge Twitter users for the blue checkmark. President Biden also expressed concern with Musk's plans for Twitter, saying on November 5 that it "spews lies all across the world". After the layoffs, employees flooded the anonymous forum service Blind with negative comments about Musk, with Twitter's co-founder and former CEO Jack Dorsey expressing gratitude toward laid-off employees and apologizing for growing the company too rapidly. The FTC commented that it was closely monitoring developments at Twitter, stressing that Musk must abide by its consent decrees, while Irish Data Protection Commissioner Helen Dixon stated that her office had reached out to Twitter to discuss privacy concerns. Social media platform Tumblr mocked the revamped verification program by allowing its users to purchase several checkmarks for their profiles.

On November 9, 2022, Biden expressed support for a U.S. government review of the foreign investors backing Musk's purchase, alluding to national security concerns. However, U.S. Treasury Secretary Janet Yellen stated that she did not see a reason to investigate the acquisition and was unaware of any national security concerns. Seven Democratic senators urged the FTC to investigate Musk's rapid changes to Twitter, while pharmaceutical company Eli Lilly suspended all advertising campaigns on Twitter after a false tweet from an impersonator account went viral. Former head of consumer product Jeff Seibert expressed disappointment and frustration over Musk's changes to Twitter. In the wake of mass employee resignations on November 17, many Twitter users posted humorous messages on the platform expressing grief and anticipating a possible shutdown of Twitter, with some posting links to their other social media accounts.

Avatar of Lori Trahan

Lori Trahan
(@RepLoriTrahan)
tweeted:

My team met with @Twitter today. They told us that they're not going to retaliate against independent journalists or researchers who publish criticisms of the platform. Less than 12 hours later, multiple technology reporters have been suspended. What's the deal, @elonmusk?

December 16, 2022

Avatar of Yvette D. Clarke

Yvette D. Clarke
(@RepYvetteClarke)
tweeted:

The gall of @elonmusk to ban respectable journalists doing important work from his platform while parading as some sort of champion of free speech is, quite frankly, detestable. I'd ask if he feels any shame, but meaningful self-reflection may simply be beyond his capacity.

December 16, 2022

Musk's suspension of journalists covering the ElonJet incident was widely condemned. CNN and The Washington Post, whose reporters were banned, criticized Musk's hypocrisy and impulsiveness, while Digital Content Next CEO Jason Kint demanded Musk explain his actions. Democrats Lori Trahan, Yvette Clarke, Ro Khanna, Ritchie Torres, and Martin Heinrich all criticized Musk, while Democrat Don Beyer also voiced disapproval with Musk's labeling of Mastodon links as malicious. Lawmakers from the EU, France, and Germany sided with the journalists and threatened to take retaliatory action against Musk.

The first weeks of Musk's tenure at Twitter were widely described as chaotic and tumultuous by the media. Harvard professor Sandra Sucher called Musk's mass layoffs "poorly handled". Gerald Hathaway of the Faegre Drinker Biddle & Reath law firm argued the opposite, believing that Musk had done what was necessary to curb Twitter's losses, assuming his claims about Twitter's losses were true. Jason Wilson of the Southern Poverty Law Center criticized Musk's perceived disinterest in "policing hate speech", observing an increase in verified white nationalists and other far-right extremists. Branko Marcetic of socialist magazine Jacobin accused Twitter of bias after several left-wing accounts were suspended. The Brookings Institution said that the importance of Twitter "as a platform for political discourse in the U.S." raised implications for national security, while cybersecurity expert Peter W. Singer detailed multiple cybersecurity concerns stemming from Musk's acquisition.

=== 2023 ===
Soon after Twitter introduced viewing Tweet limits and blocked unregistered users from viewing Tweets, numerous people voiced concerns over the decline of functionality. Mike Proulx of Forrester Research expressed on a Reuters article that the limits were "'remarkably bad' for users and advertisers already shaken by the 'chaos' Musk has brought to the platform" while Jasmine Enberg of Insider Intelligence stated her concern in the same Reuters article that the move "certainly isn't going to make it any easier to convince advertisers to return." In May 2023, Ron DeSantis launched his 2024 presidential campaign via Twitter Spaces, described as a good sign by entrepreneur David Sacks, due to high interest.

Japanese media reported that the limiting of viewing Tweets prompted many users in the country to abandon the platform entirely, with many flocking to Instagram, Threads, Bakusai, or Misskey.io. On July 3, Japanese game publisher Yostar announced that they would cease connecting their games' accounts to Twitter, citing the API change that had occurred a few days prior as the reason. The move also led to concerns over disaster relief efforts in the country, as many prefectures and cities use Twitter to share public information; with Kumamoto Prefecture's official disaster prevention Twitter account announcing that their accounts will be indefinitely out of service on July 5. The viewing Tweet limit also prompted the creation of a Japanese alternate to Twitter named Taittsuu (Japanese: たいっつー), of which 100,000 users flocked to the service within the first week of inauguration. The tweet announcing the website's inauguration stated that their intended concept was to "not remove functions of paid APIs without warning".

=== 2024 ===
In September 2024, the book Character Limit: How Elon Musk Destroyed Twitter was released. The book, by New York Times reporters Kate Conger and Ryan Mac, examines Musk's purchase of Twitter and its evolution under him.

== Statistics ==
According to a May 2023 Pew Research survey, a majority of American users say they have taken a break from Twitter in 2023, and a quarter said they were "not very or not at all likely" to continue using the platform. Analysis conducted by research firm Sensor Tower in October 2023 found that global active daily users of X via mobile apps had steadily declined during the year after Musk acquired the company, down 16% by September 2023, while the metric showed positive growth for five other major social media platforms. In November 2023, it was reported X has lost 3 million monthly UK visitors, down from 26.8 million since Musk's takeover, according to Ofcom.

Twitter revenue halved in three years, falling from a $5 billion peak in 2021, just before the acquisition, to $2.5 billion in 2024. These losses primarily came from the departure of advertisers, with the advertising sector falling by $2.8 billion.
