= Rachel Riley (consultant) =

American consultant (born 1991/1992)

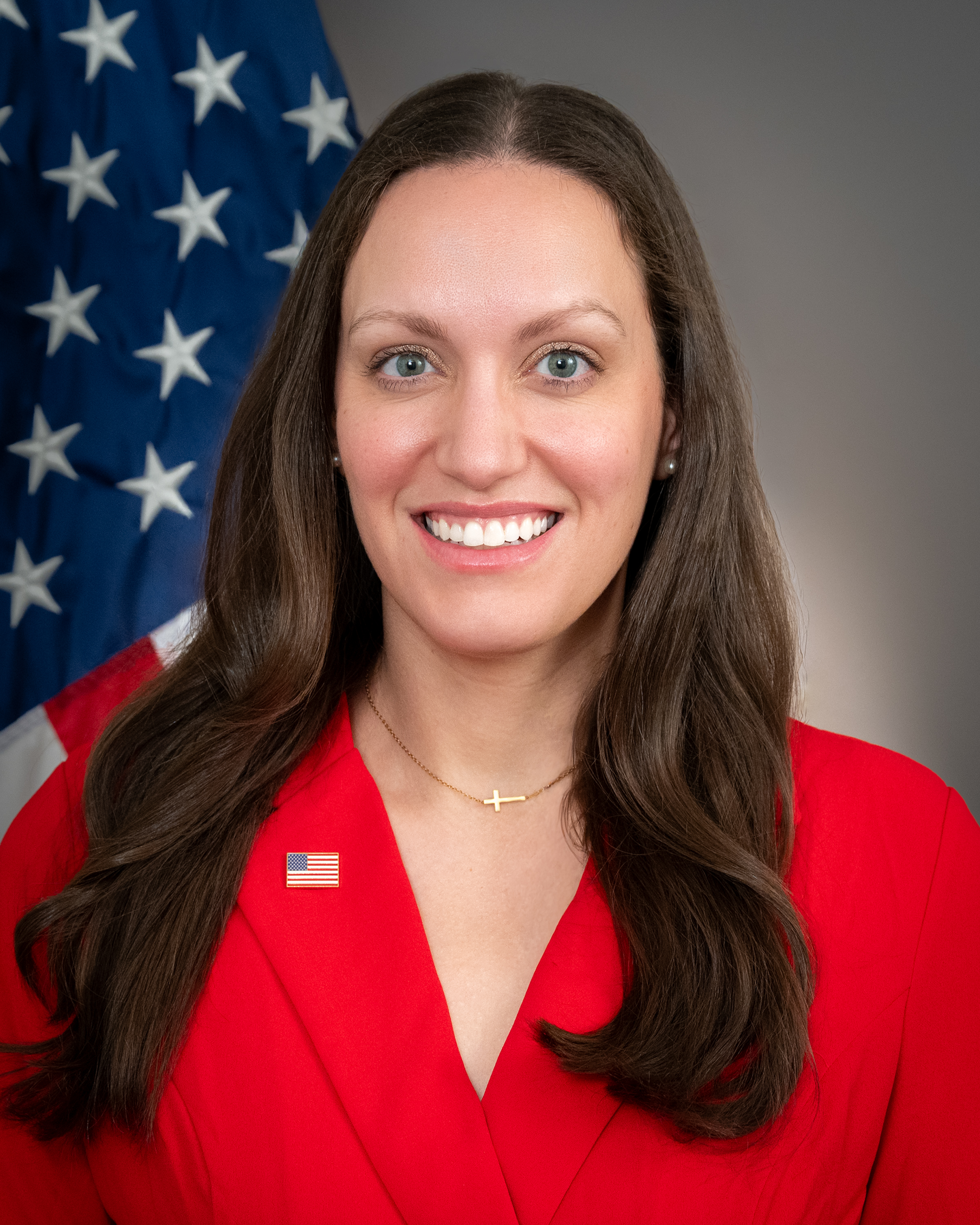
- Official portrait, 2025

Acting Chief of Naval Research
- In office October 30, 2025 – September 18, 2026
- President: Donald Trump
- Preceded by: Kurt J. Rothenhaus
- Succeeded by: Thomas C. Fu

Personal details
- Born: 1991 or 1992 (age 33–34) Greer, South Carolina, U.S.
- Education: Wofford College (BS, BA); University of Oxford (MSc, PhD)

Rachel Riley (born 1991 or 1992) is an American consultant who served as the acting chief of naval research from 2025 to 2026.

Riley graduated from Wofford College and was a Rhodes Scholar, attending the University of Oxford. After graduating from Oxford, she began working for McKinsey & Company, eventually becoming a partner. In January 2025, Riley joined the Department of Government Efficiency. Her work primarily concerned restructuring the Department of Health and Human Services.

In October 2025, Riley was named to lead the Office of Naval Research at the United States Navy. She left the position in September 2026.

== Early life and education ==
Rachel Riley was born in 1991 or 1992 in Greer, South Carolina. She attended Riverside Middle School and Mauldin High School, where she played volleyball. Riley signed with Wofford College to play volleyball. At Wofford, she majored in business economics and Chinese and was a member of Phi Beta Kappa.

Riley was named as a Rhodes Scholar finalist in November 2012 and received the scholarship, becoming the sixth person and the first woman from Wofford to become a Rhodes Scholar. She attended the University of Oxford on the scholarship.

== Career ==
=== McKinsey & Company (2017–2025) ===
After graduating from the University of Oxford, Riley began working for McKinsey & Company, eventually becoming a partner. By February 2025, she had resigned to work for the Department of Government Efficiency.

=== Department of Government Efficiency (January–October 2025) ===
By January 2025, Riley had begun working for a preliminary network that would form the Department of Government Efficiency as an associate of Brad Smith. On January 27, she began working at the Office of the Secretary at the Department of Health and Human Services alongside Luke Farritor; in February, ABC News reported that Riley was also serving as a senior advisor at the Department of State. Riley requested access to Medicare payment systems and met with the acting leadership of the Centers for Medicare & Medicaid Services that month. Joined by Farritor, her work included reviewing IT contracts at the Food and Drug Administration.

According to depositions, Riley directed grant terminations at the National Institutes of Health. In April 2025, The Washington Post obtained an internal directory indicating that Riley was working at the National Institutes of Health. As the Department of Health and Human Services faced layoffs, she was criticized by some employees for limiting access to the master reorganization plan, preventing the employees responsible for executing the layoffs from viewing data files. In September 2025, Riley led an unsuccessful effort to fire 8,000 workers at the department ahead of a federal government shutdown, including an attempt to dissolve the Center for Scientific Review at the National Institutes of Health.

=== Acting chief of naval research (2025–2026) ===
On October 30, 2025, Politico reported that Riley had been named as the acting chief of naval research, succeeding Kurt J. Rothenhaus. The position had been usually occupied by a rear admiral. As the chief of naval research, Riley sought to work with the private industry and deduplicate work with the private sector. In September 2026, Secretary of the Navy Hung Cao appointed Thomas C. Fu to succeed Riley, with Riley moving to another position within the Department of the Navy.

== Works cited ==
- Castello, Bob (November 18, 2008). "Mavs' Younginer signs with Tigers". The Greenville News. Archived from the original on November 10, 2025.
- Cai, Sophia; Cancryn, Adam; Gardner, Lauren (March 31, 2025). "Internal fallout at HHS delays 10,000 firings". Politico. Archived from the original on September 28, 2025.
- Camden, Nora (September 21, 2026). "Thomas Fu Named Office of Naval Research Leader; Hung Cao Quoted". ExecutiveGov.
- Cirruzzo, Chelsea; Hooper, Kelly (February 27, 2025). "CDC firings include key lab safety jobs". Politico.
- "Former Mauldin star Woodlee pursues Rhodes Scholarship". The Greenville News. November 14, 2012.
- Green, Ann (December 4, 2012). "Woodlee earns Rhodes Scholarship". The State.
- Hearne, David (August 31, 2007). "Sabres finish strong against Mavericks". The Greenville News.
- Lerman, Rachel; Torbati, Yeganeh; Frankel, Todd; Siddiqui, Faiz (April 8, 2025). "The DOGE employees and allies working on Elon Musk's government goals". The Washington Post.
- Lundeen, Nan (December 22, 2004). "Airmen thank Riverside Middle students for outpouring of care". The Greenville News.
- Mitchell, Ellen (October 30, 2025). "DOGE staffer set to replace admiral leading Navy's research office". The Hill.
- "Names & Faces". The Greenville News. May 18, 2005.
- Olmstead, Edith (October 30, 2025). "Trump Replaces Key Navy Official With Elon Musk DOGE Stooge". The New Republic. Archived from the original on November 23, 2025.
- Röhn, Tim; Schumaker, Erin (October 30, 2025). "DOGE holdover who pushed for deep cuts at HHS is headed to the Navy". Politico.
- Sandiford, Michele (June 22, 2026). "Office of Naval Research rolls out new science and technology strategy". WFED.
- Schleifer, Theodore; Ngo, Madeleine (January 12, 2025). "Inside Elon Musk's Plan for DOGE to Slash Government Costs". The New York Times.
- Schleifer, Theodore; Nehamas, Nicholas; Conger, Kate; Mac, Ryan (February 7, 2025). "Young Aides Emerge as Enforcers in Musk's Broadside Against Government". The New York Times. Archived from the original on February 8, 2025.
- Steakin, Will; Flaherty, Anne (February 14, 2025). "Key Musk DOGE adviser meets with leaders of Medicare agency". ABC News.
- Waldman, Annie (May 7, 2025). "Trump's NIH Axed Research Grants Even After a Judge Blocked the Cuts, Internal Records Show". ProPublica.
