= Admiral Carr =

Admiral Carr may refer to:

- Kenneth Monroe Carr (1925–2015), U.S. Navy vice admiral
- Nevin Carr (born 1956), U.S. Navy admiral
- William Carr (admiral) (1883–1966), Royal Australian Navy rear admiral
