= Lorin Selby =

U.S. Navy admiral

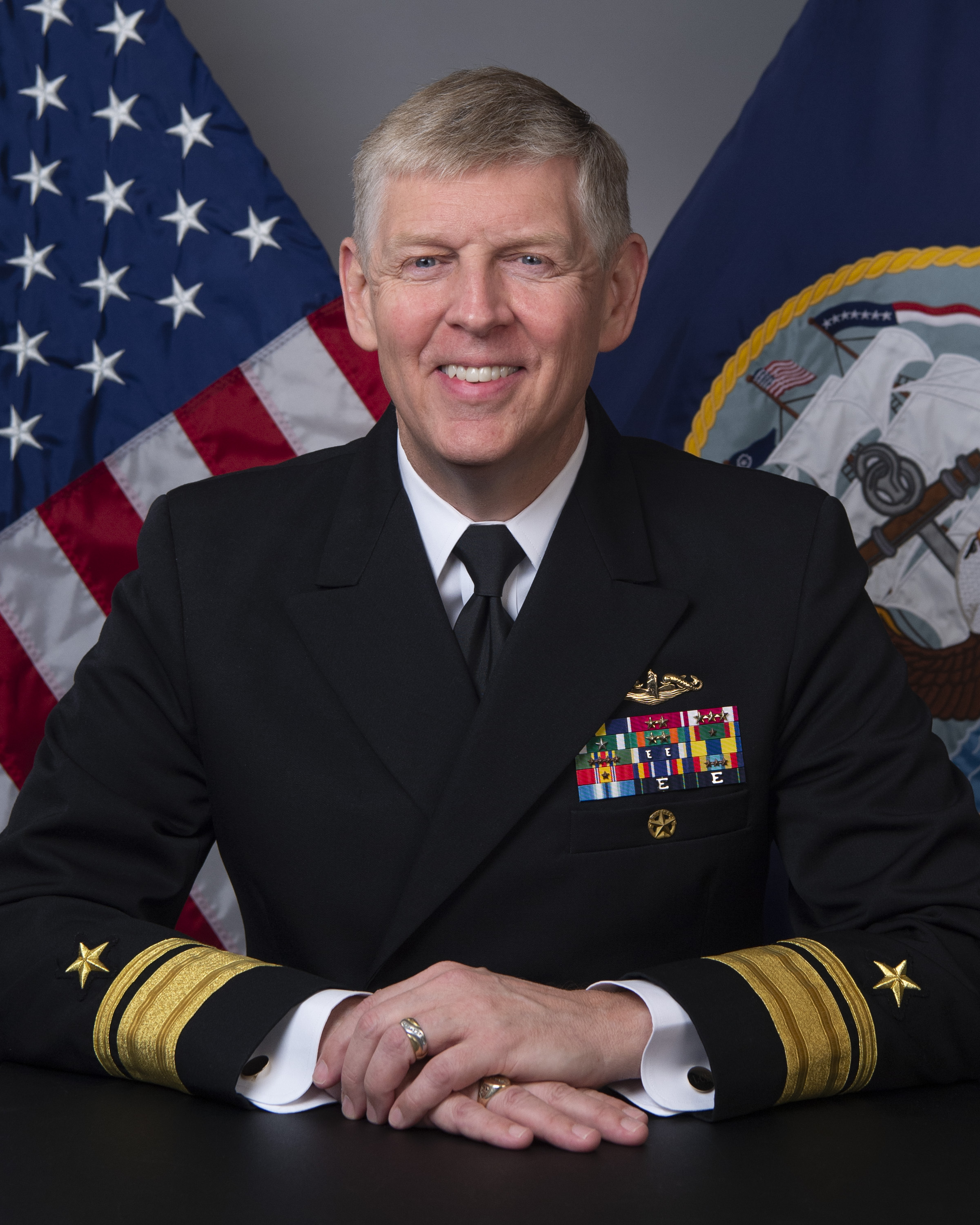
- Official portrait, 2020
- Born: 1963 (age 62–63); Baltimore, Maryland, U.S.
- Military career
- Allegiance: United States
- Branch: United States Navy
- Service years: 1986–2023
- Rank: Rear Admiral
- Commands: Chief of Naval Research; Naval Surface Warfare Center; USS Greeneville

Lorin Cave Selby (born 1963) is a retired United States Navy rear admiral who last served as the Chief of Naval Research from May 31, 2020 to June 16, 2023. Previously, he served as the Chief Engineer of the United States Navy and Deputy Commander for Ship Design, Integration, and Naval Engineering of the Naval Sea Systems Command from June 2016 until May 2020.

Born and raised in Baltimore, Maryland, Selby graduated from the University of Virginia in December 1986 with a Bachelor of Science degree in nuclear engineering. He later earned a Master of Science degree in nuclear engineering and a Nuclear Engineer degree from the Massachusetts Institute of Technology. His June 1993 thesis was entitled Experimental Evaluation of an Instrumented Synthesis Method for the Real-Time Estimation of Reactivity.

After retiring from the Navy, Selby joined WestExec Advisors, a consulting firm serving undisclosed clients in the defense industry.

Military offices
Preceded by Lawrence Creevy	Commander of the Naval Surface Warfare Center; 2014–2016	Succeeded by Tom Druggan
Preceded by ???	Chief Engineer of the United States Navy and Deputy Commander for Ship Design, Integration, and Naval Engineering of the Naval Sea Systems Command; 2016–2020	Succeeded by Jason M. Lloyd
Preceded by David Hahn	Chief of Naval Research; 2020–2023	Succeeded by Kurt J. Rothenhaus
