= Robert Keith Geiger =

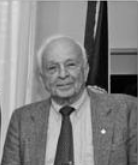
- Born: October 27, 1923
- Died: June 1, 2013
- Rank: Rear Admiral
- Commands: Chief of Naval Research

Robert K. Geiger (October 27, 1923 - June 1, 2013) was an American admiral. He served as Chief of Naval Research from 1975 to 1978.
