= L. S. Kollmorgen =

U.S. Navy rear admiral (1927–2025)

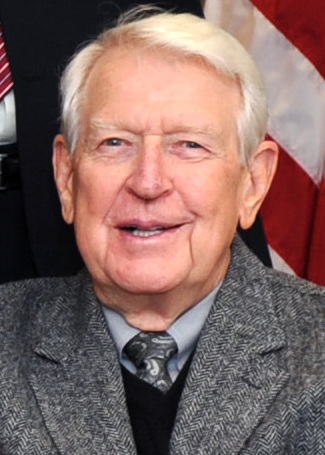
- Kollmorgen in 2014
- Born: May 20, 1927; Los Angeles, California, U.S.
- Died: March 15, 2025 (aged 97)
- Military career
- Allegiance: United States of America
- Branch: United States Navy
- Rank: Rear admiral
- Nickname: Lee
- Commands: Chief of Naval Research
- Conflicts: Vietnam War

Leland Stanford Kollmorgen (May 20, 1927 – March 15, 2025) was a rear admiral in the United States Navy. He served as Chief of Naval Research from 1981 to 1983.

== Biography ==
Kollmorgen was a 1951 graduate of the United States Naval Academy. He later earned a master's degree in Foreign Affairs from George Washington University in 1966.

While serving with VAP-61 on USS Kitty Hawk in 1964, Kollmorgen was awarded the Distinguished Flying Cross for actions over Laos. While serving with VA-165 on USS Ranger in 1968, he was awarded the Silver Star for actions over Hanoi. Kollmorgen later commanded both VA-165 and VA-128.

Kollmorgen served as the military assistant to President Gerald Ford from April 1975 to June 1976.

Kollmorgen died on March 15, 2025, at the age of 97.
