= Character Limit: How Elon Musk Destroyed Twitter =

2024 book by Kate Conger and Ryan Mac

- Authors: Kate Conger; Ryan Mac
- Subject: Elon Musk; Twitter; business
- Published: September 17, 2024
- Publisher: Penguin Press
- Pages: 480
- ISBN: 978-0-593-65613-6 (hardcover)

Character Limit: How Elon Musk Destroyed Twitter is a 2024 book written by Kate Conger and Ryan Mac. It covers the controversial takeover of Twitter by Elon Musk. Character Limit was published on September 17, 2024, by Penguin Press.

== Premise ==
Character Limit chronicles the rise and fall of Twitter after Elon Musk's tumultuous $44-billion acquisition. The book showcases Musk's volatility, highlighting the actions that led to the company's drastic devaluation and the resurgence of unmoderated hate-speech, misinformation, and white nationalism on the platform.

Conger and Mac detail the night Musk's Twitter acquisition was formalized in at Twitter's headquarters in San Francisco. Twitter's San Francisco headquarters are two different buildings: a large building and a small building behind it which are connected via a bridge. On the night of October 26, 2022, there were "two separate worlds playing out on either side of the bridge" with Musk signing the acquisition documents with executives in the smaller building while Twitter employees in the larger building were crying at potentially losing their job. Another detail in the book is how Musk had cut Twitter's janitorial staff, forcing Twitter employees to bring their own toilet paper to work.

== Reception ==
Prior to its release, Character Limit was listed as one of Literary Hub's most anticipated books of 2024.

Kirkus Reviews praised the book as an "engrossing, precise account of Elon Musk's takeover of Twitter (now X). A compelling fusion of business history and worrisome social narrative".

James Ball of The Guardian, in a positive review, wrote that Conger and Mac have the "astonishing ability to take the reader into almost every room that mattered during the contentious $44bn acquisition".

Zack Ruskin of The Washington Post called Character Limit "riveting" and writes the book "offers a treasure trove of answers regarding Elon Musk's somewhat shadowy acquisition of the company, both in terms of the financials and his motivation." Ruskin said the book serves as a "telling lesson in the cost of getting everything you want".
