= Chief of Naval Research =

Senior military officer in the U.S. Navy for scientific research

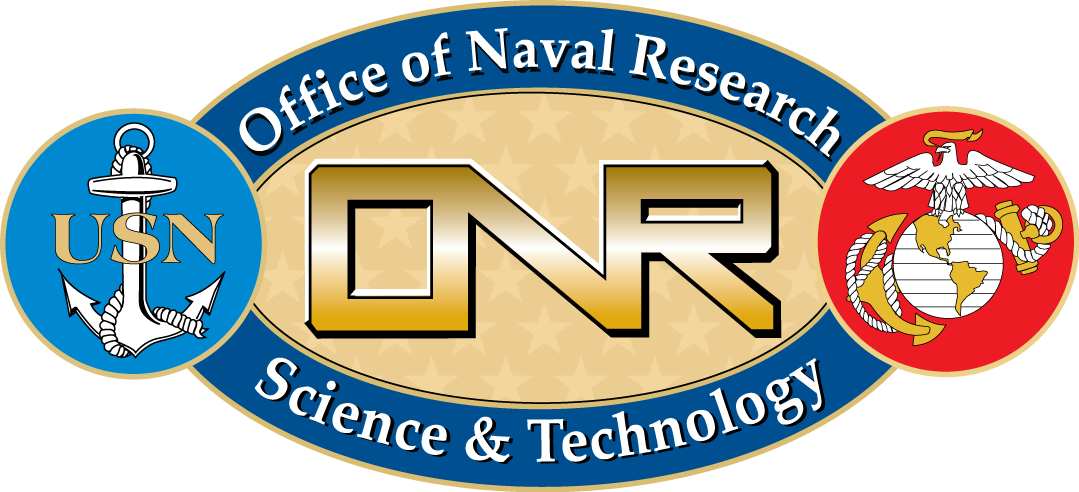
- Seal of the Office of Naval Research

- Flag of a Navy rear admiral

- Incumbent; Thoms C. Fu; Acting since September 2025
- Department of the Navy
- Reports to: Assistant Secretary of the Navy (Research, Development, and Acquisition)
- Seat: Arlington County, Virginia, US
- Appointer: The president; with Senate advice and consent
- Constituting instrument: 10 U.S.C. § 5022
- Deputy: Vice Chief of Naval Research
- Website: Office of Naval Research

The chief of naval research is the senior military officer in charge of scientific research in the United States Navy. The chief of naval research is in charge of the Office of Naval Research. The position is typically, but not always, held by a US Navy rear admiral.

The chief of naval research has responsibility for basic research, applied research, and advanced technology development components of the Navy's research and development programs (the first three of the seven categories used in the Department of Defense research and development budget, often referred to as 6.1, 6.2, and 6.3, respectively), as well as the Navy's intellectual property policy. The chief of naval research also coordinates with other research and development agencies within the Department of the Navy, such as the Naval Warfare Centers of the Naval Systems Commands.

Other positions in the Office of Naval Research leadership include the vice chief of naval research (a one-star Marine Corps brigadier general), the assistant chief of naval research and commanding officer of ONR Global (both captains), and the executive director and assistant vice chief of naval research (both civilians). The chief of naval research reports directly to the civilian assistant secretary of the Navy for research, development, and acquisition, and is thus not organizationally subordinate to the chief of naval operations, the senior military officer in the entire Navy.

== History ==
The predecessor to the Office of Naval Research was the Office of the Coordinator of Research and Development, an institution within the Navy during World War II meant to coordinate between the military-wide Office of Scientific Research and Development (OSRD), Navy materiel bureaus, and civilian research organizations. The organization was formed in 1941 and was nicknamed the "Bird Dogs" due to their skill at finding and solving interorganizational problems. Jerome Clarke Hunsaker was interim chief, followed by Rear Admiral Julius A. Furer. OSRD was disbanded after the war, and the Office of the Coordinator of Research and Development was incorporated into the new Navy Office of Research and Inventions, headed by Harold Bowen, which became the Office of Naval Research in 1946.

Between 1945 and 2025, the position was always held by an active duty navy flag officer, usually a rear admiral. This tradition was broken during the second trump administration when Rachel Riley was appointed as the first non-military Chief of Naval Research.

=== List of chiefs of naval research ===
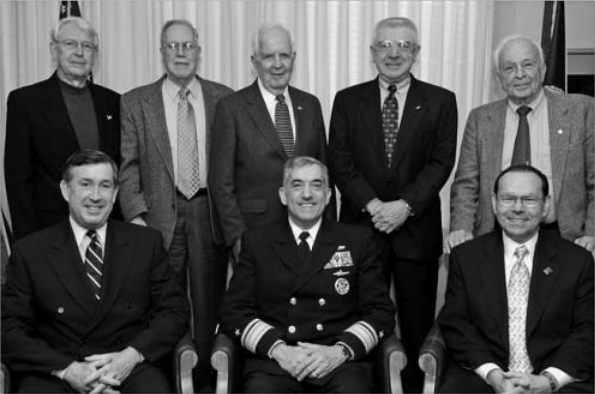
Several former chiefs of naval research photographed in 2005. Back: L. S. Kollmorgen, Brad Mooney, Dick Van Orden, Albert Baciocco, R. K. Geiger. Front: Paul Gaffney, Jay Cohen, William Miller.

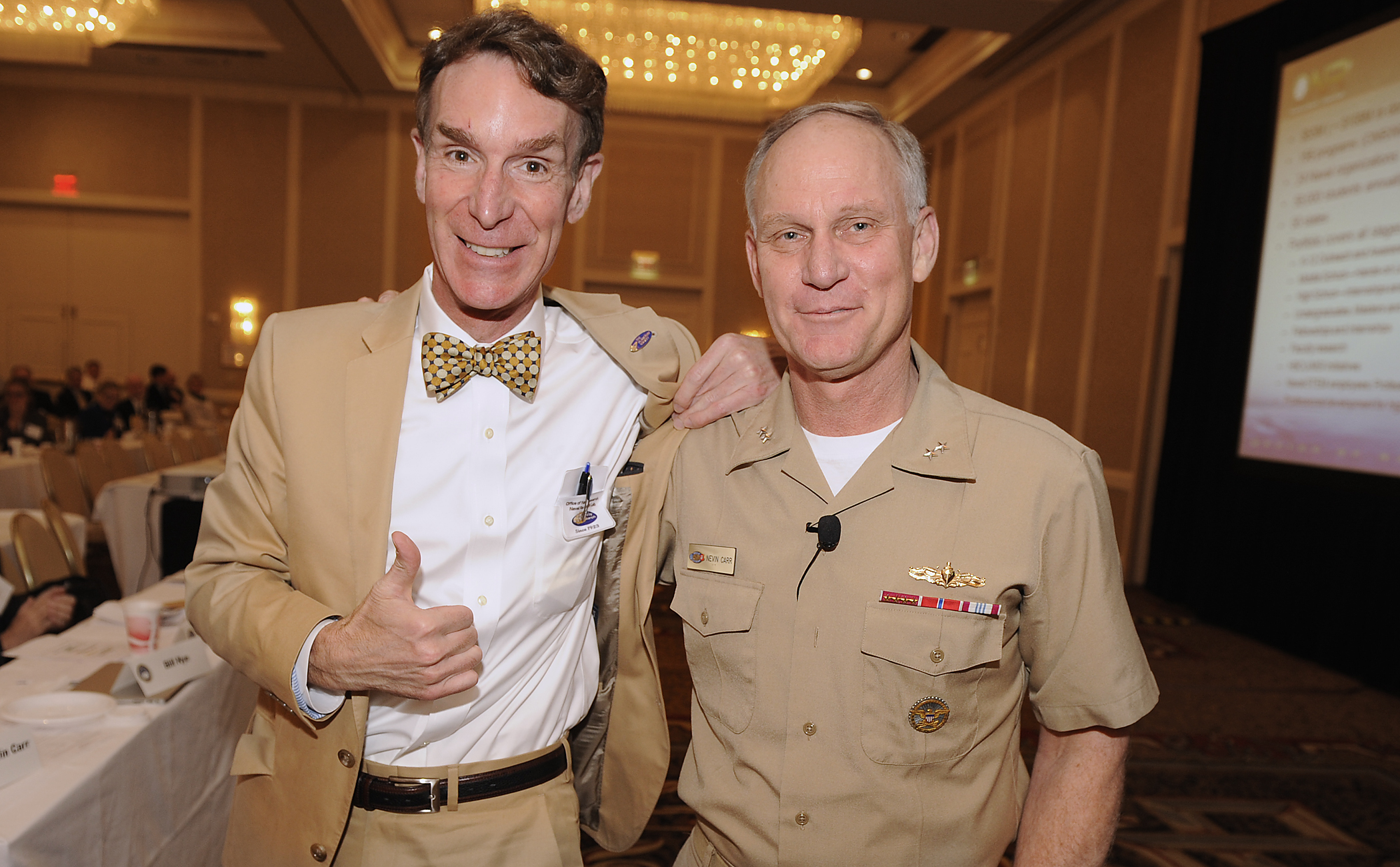
Chief of Naval Research Nevin Carr with Bill Nye in 2011. Nye had just excitedly accepted an ONR pocket protector presented by Carr.

#	Image	Chief of Naval Research	Term	Refs
1		Harold G. Bowen Sr.	1946–1947	
2		Paul F. Lee	1947–1949	
3		Thorvald A. Solberg	1949–1951	
4		Calvin Matthews Bolster	1951–1953	
5		Frederick R. Furth	1953–1956	
6		Rawson Bennett II	1956–1961	
7		Leonidas Dixon Coates, Jr.	1961–1964	
8		John K. Leydon	1964–1968	
9		Thomas Barron Owen	1968–1970	
10		Carl O. Holmquist	1970–1973	
11		M. Dick Van Orden	1973–1975	
12		Robert Keith Geiger	1975–1978	
13		Albert Baciocco	1978–1981	
14		L. S. Kollmorgen	1981–1983	
15		Brad Mooney	1983–1987	
16		John R. Wilson, Jr.	1987–1990	
17		William C. Miller	1991–1993	
18		Marc Y. E. Pelaez	1993–1996	
19		Paul G. Gaffney II	1996–2000	
20		Jay M. Cohen	2000–2006	
21		William E. Landay III	2006–2008	
22		Nevin P. Carr, Jr.	2008–2011	
23		Matthew L. Klunder	2011–2014	
24		Mathias W. Winter	2014–2016	
25		David J. Hahn	2016–2020	
26		Lorin C. Selby	2020–2023	
27		Kurt J. Rothenhaus	2023–2025	
28		Rachel Riley	2025–2026	
-		Thomas C. Fu (Acting)	2026-present	
