= Leonidas Dixon Coates Jr. =

US Navy rear admiral

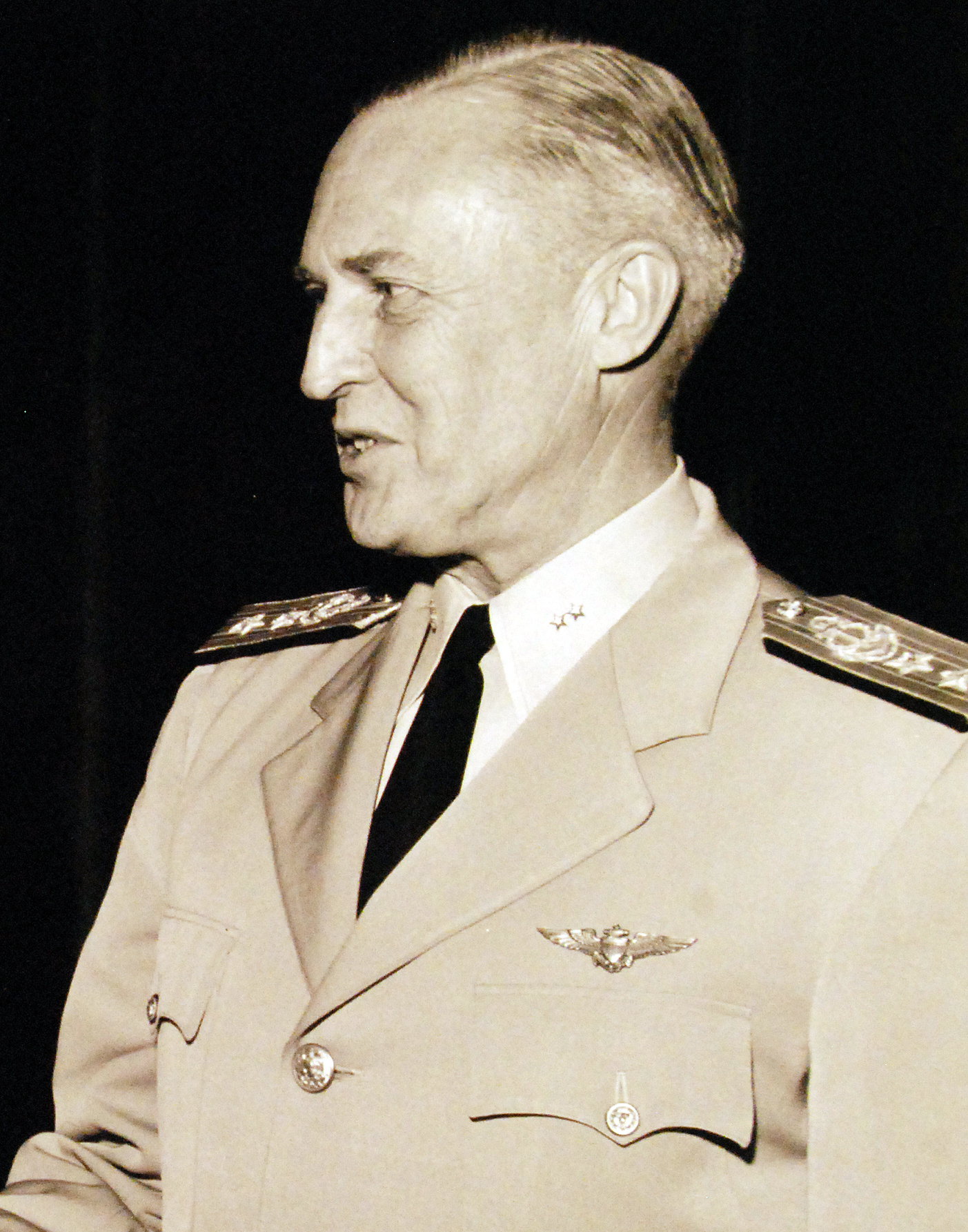
- Born: October 24, 1907 (age 118); Fresno, California
- Military career
- Allegiance: United States
- Branch: United States Navy
- Rank: Rear admiral
- Commands: Chief of Naval Research

Leonidas Dixon Coates Jr. was a rear admiral in the United States Navy.

== Education ==
He was a 1926 graduate of Oakland Technical High School in Oakland, California, and went on to the United States Naval Academy, where he graduated as an ensign on June 5, 1930.

== Career ==
Between 1930 and 1936 he served on the USS New York (BB-34), USS Texas (BB-35), USS Pennsylvania (BB-38), USS Saratoga (CV-3), and after flight training served as a naval aviator in Patrol Squadron Seventy-Four aboard the USS Houston (CA-30).

In 1936 he began studies at the Naval Postgraduate School, then moving to California Institute of Technology where he revived a master's degree in aeronautical engineering in 1939.

Between 1939 and 1941 he served as a naval aviator with VF-3 and Patrol Squadron Seventy-Four.

In 1949 he began to move into more administrative shore-based roles in the Bureau of Aeronautics, starting as the Deputy Director of the Aircraft Division, then the Director of the Guided Missiles Division in 1951, then the Deputy Assistant Chief for Research and Development in June 1951, then Assistant Bureau Chief in 1957, and finally Deputy Bureau Chief in 1959. He became Chief of Naval Research in February 1961 and head the post until his retirement in 1964.
