= Brad Mooney =

American Navy admiral (1931–2014)

Bradford Mooney
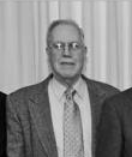
- Mooney in 2005
- Born: March 26, 1931; Portsmouth, New Hampshire, U.S.
- Died: May 30, 2014 (aged 83); Austin, Texas, U.S.
- Military career
- Allegiance: United States
- Branch: United States Navy
- Rank: Rear admiral
- Commands: Chief of Naval Research (1983 - 1987) Oceanographer of the Navy (1981 - 1983) Charleston Naval Shipyard (1972 - 1975)

John Bradford Mooney Jr. (March 26, 1931 – May 30, 2014) was a rear admiral in the United States Navy. He was a 1953 graduate of the United States Naval Academy. He served as Chief of Naval Research from 1983 to 1987 and Oceanographer of the United States Navy from 1981 to 1983.

== Education ==
Mooney graduated high school in 1949 and then won an appointment to US naval academy, where he graduated in 1953. In 1955 he attended submarine school.

== Career ==
Between 1953 and 1955, Mooney spent two years serving on surface ships. After attending submarine school, he spent 1955 to 1964 serving on submarines. His first command came in 1964 when he was appointed as the officer in charge of Trieste II, the Navy's first bathyscaphe (self-propelled deep-sea submersible).

As commander of Trieste II between 1964 and 1966, Mooney participated in several significant recovery and forensic investigation operations. The first of these was investigating the wreck of the nuclear submarine USS Thresher (SSN-593) in 1964, and Mooney personally piloted Trieste II for many of these dives and was designated US Navy Deep Submersible Pilot #5. In 1966, he participated in the mission to find the hydrogen bomb lost in the sea during the Palomares accident. In 1966 he was appointed the commanding officer of the submarine USS Menhaden (SS-377) and between 1966 and 1968 lead the submarine through two six-month tours off the coast of Vietnam during the Vietnam War.

After his operational command of the USS Menhaden, he spent the rest of his career in shore-based administrative roles. Starting in 1968, he was asked to organize a new office in The Pentagon responsible for overseeing all US Navy deep submergence activities, including his former Trieste II unit. In this capacity, he helped lead the investigation into the loss of the USS Scorpion (SSN-589) in 1969. In 1971 he was appointed chief staff officer of Submarine Development Group One. In 1972 he became the commanding officer of the Charleston Naval Shipyard. In 1975 he was named deputy director of the Deep Submergence Systems Division in OPNAV. In 1977 he was given command of Naval Training Center Orlando.

He was promoted to rear admiral in 1977, and his first command after this promotion was as the director of total force planning in the Office of the Chief of Naval Operations. He was appointed Oceanographer of the Navy in 1981. And as his final posting he served as Chief of Naval Research between 1983 and 1987, before retiring.

== Awards ==
Mooney received two awards of the Legion of Merit, three Meritorious Service Medals, and two Navy Unit Commendations. He was elected to the National Academy of Engineering in 1988, was elected a fellow of the The Explorers Club in 1995, and received the Compass Distinguished Achievement award from the Marine Technology Society in 1999.
