= Albert Baciocco =

Albert Joseph Baciocco, Jr.
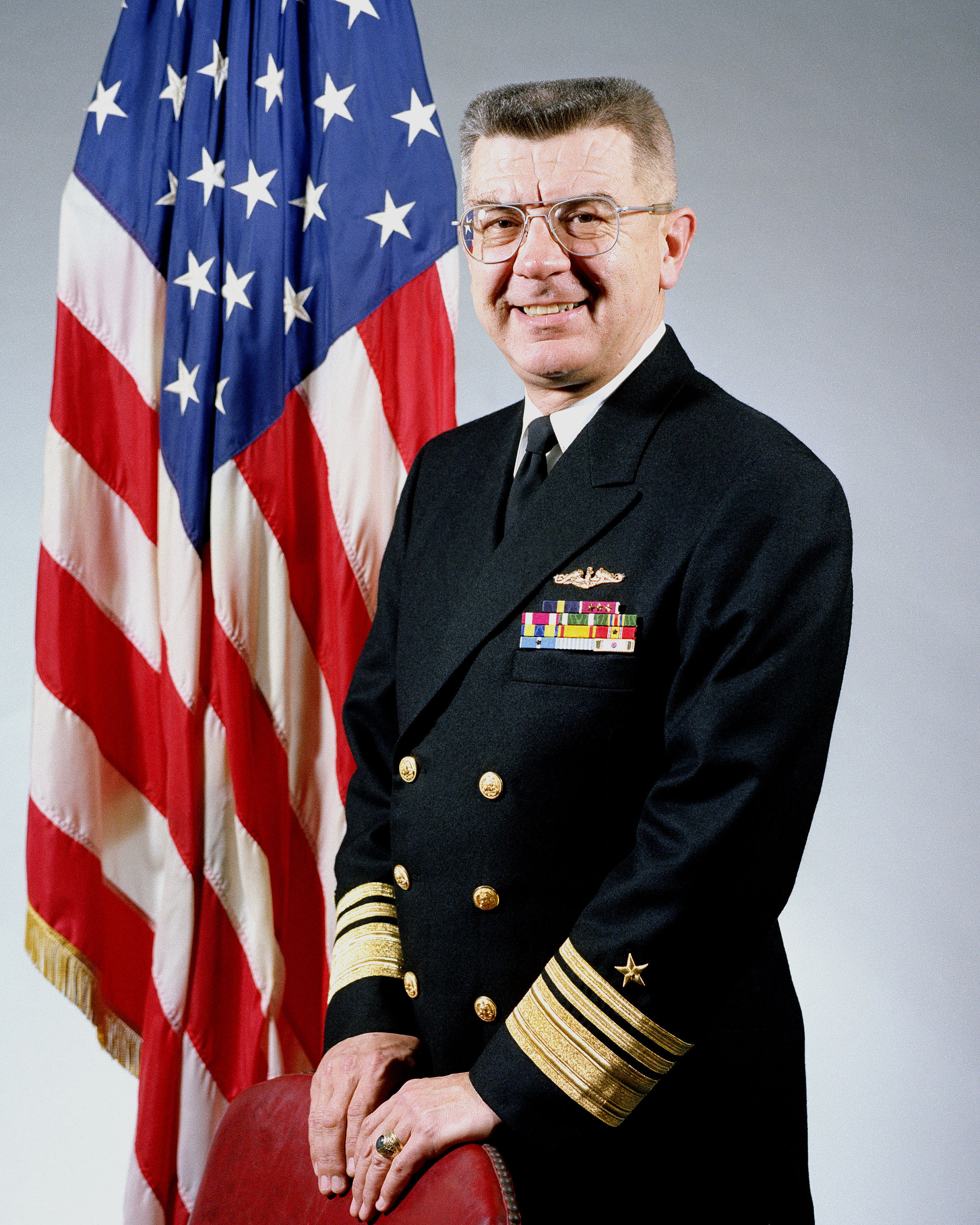
- Vice Admiral Baciocco in 1984
- Born: March 4, 1931; San Francisco, California, U.S.
- Died: May 22, 2015 (aged 84); Mount Pleasant, South Carolina, U.S.
- Military career
- Allegiance: United States
- Branch: United States Navy
- Service years: 1953–1987
- Rank: Vice admiral
- Nickname: Al
- Commands: Chief of Naval Research; Submarine Group Six; Submarine Squadron Four; Submarine Division Forty-Two; USS Gato

Albert Joseph Baciocco, Jr. (March 4, 1931 – May 22, 2015) was a vice admiral in the United States Navy. He was a 1953 graduate of the United States Naval Academy. He served as Chief of Naval Research from 1978 to 1981 and Director of Research, Development, and Acquisition from 1983 to 1987.

Baciocco died in 2015. He was interred at the United States Naval Academy Cemetery.
