= Trieste II (bathyscaphe) =

United States Navy's second bathyscaphe

Coordinates: 47.70024°N 122.62381°W

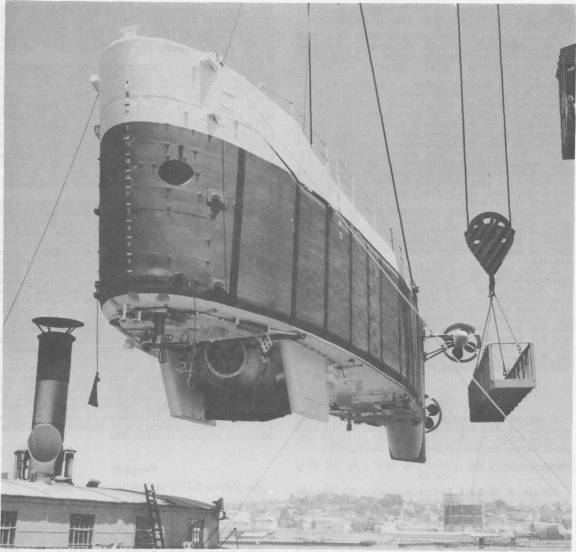
- Trieste II

History

United States
- Name: Trieste II
- Builder: Mare Island Naval Shipyard
- Completed: 1964
- In service: 1 September 1969
- Out of service: 1980
- Reclassified: X-1, 1 September 1969; DSV-1, 1 June 1971
- Fate: Preserved at the Naval Undersea Museum

General characteristics
- Type: Deep-submergence vehicle
- Displacement: 46 long tons (47 t)
- Length: 67 ft (20 m)
- Beam: 15 ft (4.6 m)
- Draft: 12 ft 5 in (3.78 m)
- Test depth: 20,000 ft (6,100 m)
- Complement: 2

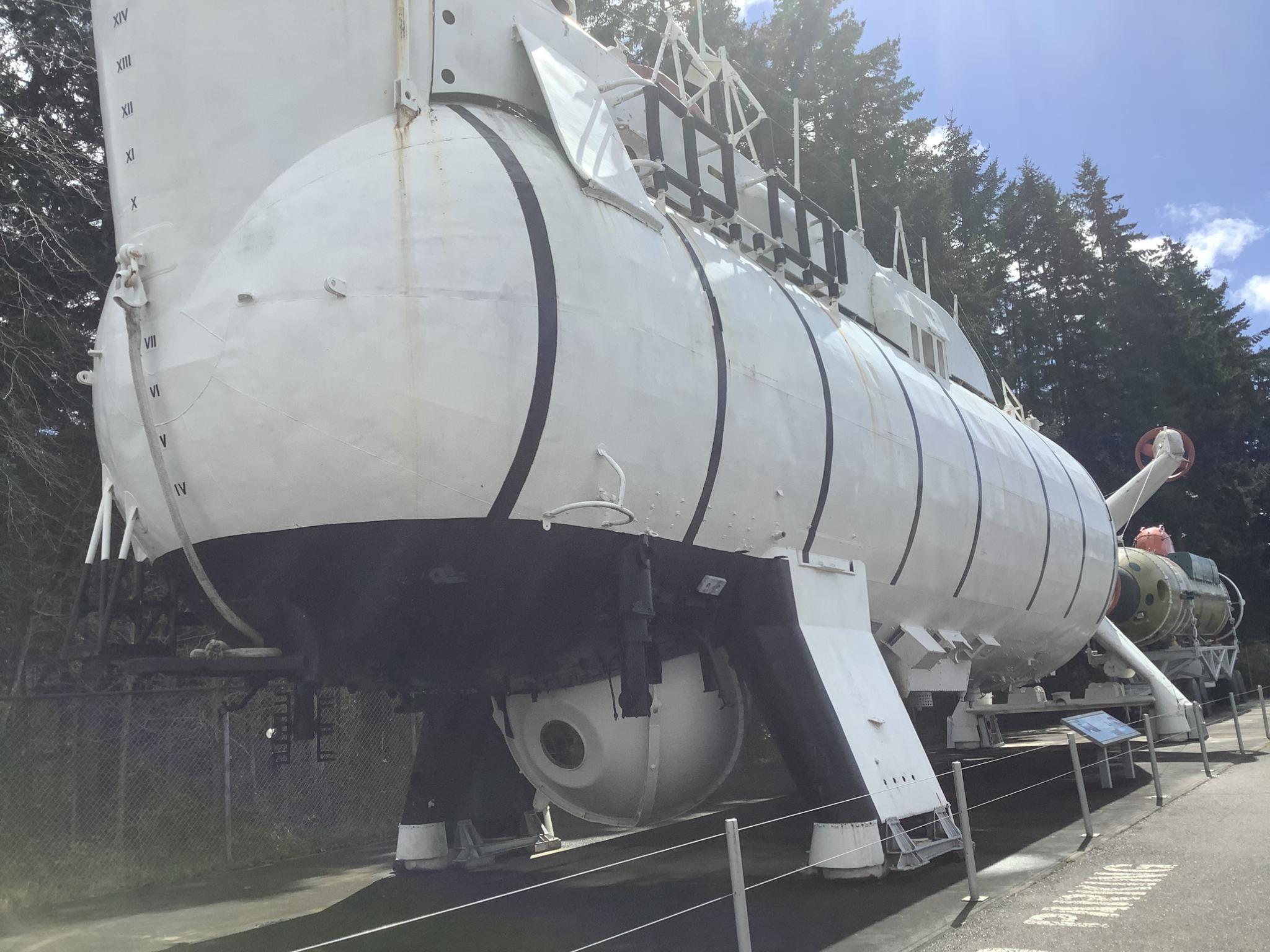
Trieste II on display at the Naval Undersea Museum, 2023

Trieste II (DSV-1) is the United States Navy's first bathyscaphe purchased from its Swiss designers, and the successor to Trieste.

== History ==
The original Trieste design was heavily modified by the Naval Electronics Laboratory in San Diego, California and built at the Mare Island Naval Shipyard. Trieste II incorporated the original Terni, Italian-built sphere used in Trieste, after it was made redundant by the new high-pressure sphere cast by the German Krupp Steelworks. The Trieste sphere was suspended from an entirely new float, more seaworthy and streamlined than the original, but operating on identical principles. Completed in early 1964, Trieste II was placed on board USNS Francis X. McGraw (T-AK241) and shipped, via the Panama Canal, to Boston.

Commanded by Lt Comdr. John B. Mooney Jr., with co-pilot Lt. John H. Howland and Capt. Frank Andrews, Trieste II conducted dives in the vicinity of the loss site of Thresher – operations commenced by the first Trieste the year before. She recovered bits of wreckage, positively fixing the remains as that of the lost Thresher, in September 1964.

Between September 1965 and May 1966, Trieste II again underwent extensive modification and conversion at Mare Island Naval Shipyard, but there is no clear record that she was ever operated in that new configuration, i.e., the addition of skegs or outriggers on both sides of the sphere.

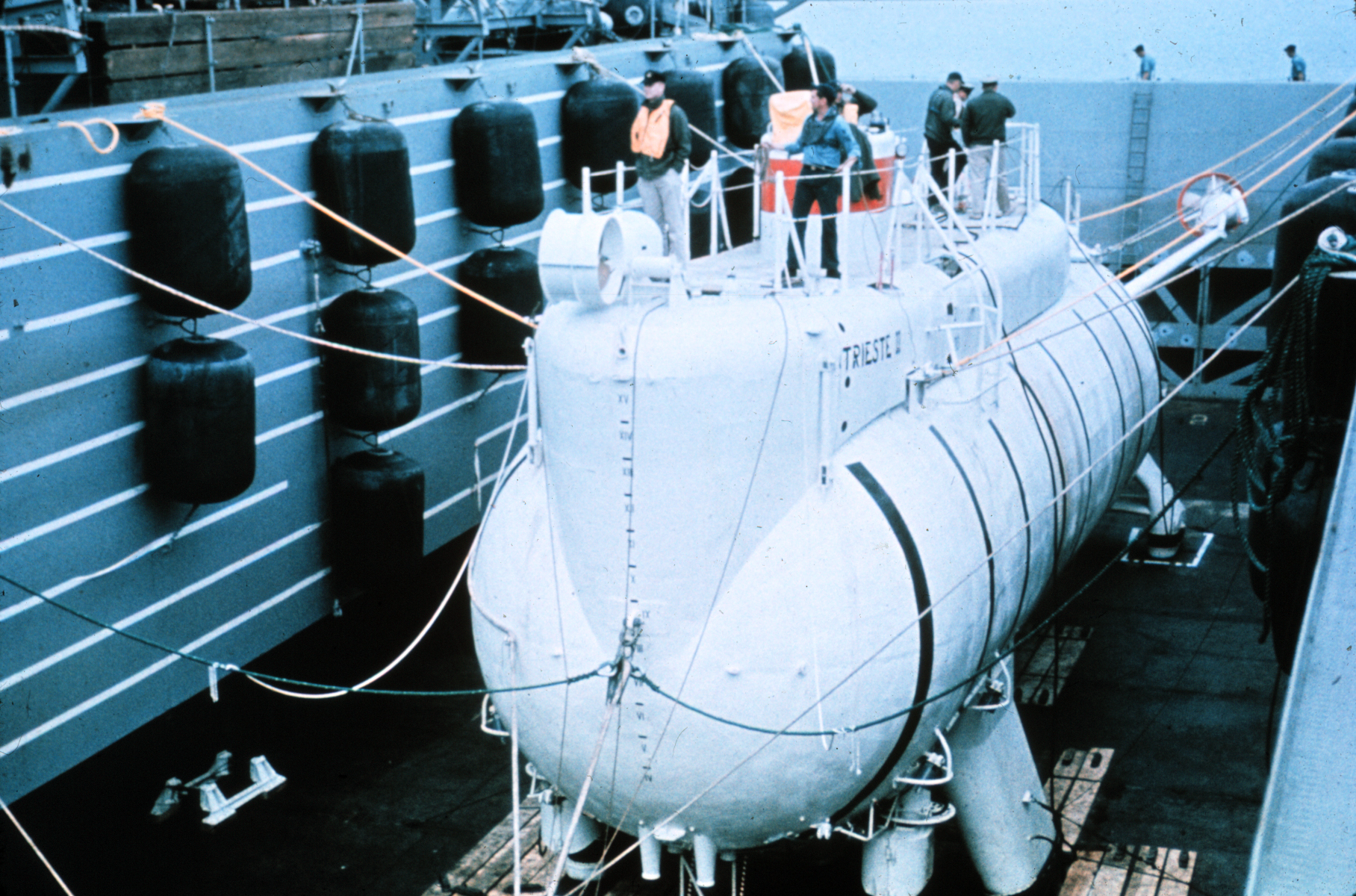
Trieste II in its third configuration.

During that same time period, work was under way on a third configuration of the bathyscaphe. This work resulted in yet a new appearance for the Trieste II, and included the installation of a new pressure sphere, designed for operation to 20,000 feet (6,100 m).

As the bathyscaphe continued her operations as a test vehicle for the deep submergence program, she qualified four officers as "hydronauts" – the beginning of a burgeoning oceanographic operation. Trieste II's valuable experience in deep submergence operations has helped in the design and construction of other deep-diving submersibles which could be used in rescuing crews and recovering objects from submarines in distress below levels reachable by conventional methods.

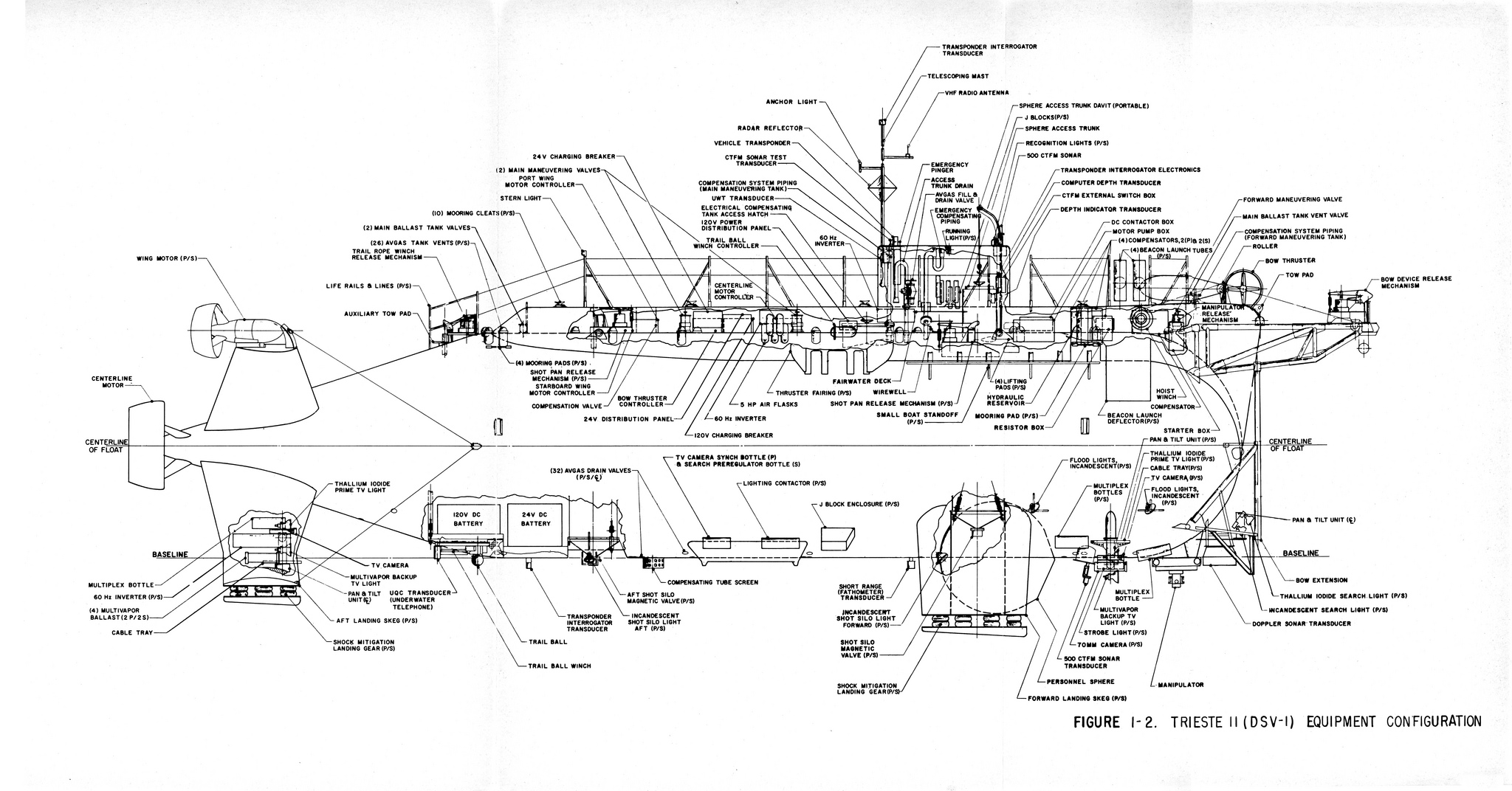
Equipment configuration.

This unique craft was listed only as "equipment" in the Navy inventory until the autumn of 1969. On 1 September 1969, Trieste II was placed in service, with the hull number X-1. She was reclassified as a deep submergence vehicle (DSV) on 1 June 1971.

On 25 April 1972, Trieste II recovered a satellite package called a "bucket" weighing several hundred pounds from a depth of greater than 16,000 feet (4,900 m), a record at the time. Trieste II (DSV-1) continued her active service in the Pacific Fleet into 1980.

The Trieste class DSV were replaced by the Alvin class DSV, as exemplified by the famous Alvin (DSV-2). The Alvins are more capable, more maneuverable, less fragile, but also can not dive as deep, reaching only a maximum of 20,000 feet (6,100 m) (for the Sea Cliff (DSV-4)).

Trieste II is now preserved as a museum ship at the Naval Undersea Museum, Keyport, Washington.

== Awards ==
- Navy Unit Commendation with star
- Meritorious Unit Commendation with star

== See also ==
- Deep-submergence vehicle – Self-propelled deep-diving crewed submersible
- Deep-submergence rescue vehicle – Submersible used for rescue of people from disabled submarines and submersibles
- DSV Alvin – Crewed deep-ocean research submersible (DSV-2)
