= Dick Van Orden =

US Navy rear admiral (1921–2018)

M. Dick Van Orden
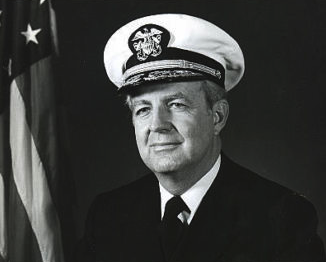
- Born: February 24, 1921; Austin, Texas, U.S.
- Died: December 9, 2018 (aged 97); Arlington, Virginia, U.S.
- Military career
- Allegiance: United States
- Branch: United States Navy
- Service years: 1944–1975
- Rank: Rear admiral
- Commands: Chief of Naval Research

Merton Dick Van Orden (February 24, 1921 – December 9, 2018) was a rear admiral in the United States Navy. He was in the class of 1945 at the United States Naval Academy, but due to World War 2 he and the rest of his class graduated in 1944. He served as Chief of Naval Research from 1973 to his retirement in 1975. Van Orden died of cancer in 2018, aged 97.
