= Matthew L. Klunder =

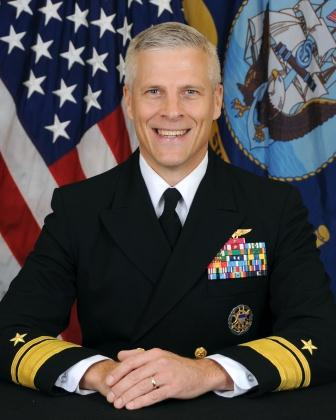
Matthew L. Klunder while serving as Chief of Naval Research around 2011

Rear Admiral Matthew Lewis Klunder (born June 24, 1960) was the Chief of Naval Research at the Office of Naval Research in Arlington, Virginia from 2011 to 2014. In July 2010, Klunder reported as director of Intelligence, Surveillance and Reconnaissance Capabilities Division, OPNAV N2/N6F2 following his assignment as the 83rd Commandant of Midshipmen of the United States Naval Academy.

Klunder was born in Newport News, Virginia and raised in Alexandria, Virginia; he attended Groveton High School and graduated from the United States Naval Academy in 1982.

After completing a short assignment at the Naval Research Laboratory in Washington, D.C., he entered Naval Aviator training, receiving his "Wings of Gold" on 26 September 1984 in Meridian, Mississippi.

Klunder's first squadron tour was with Carrier Airborne Early Warning Squadron (VAW) 112 from May 1985 to May 1988. While a member of the "Golden Hawks," he made two Western Pacific/Indian Ocean deployments aboard the supercarrier USS Kitty Hawk (CV-63), including a round-the-world cruise.

Assigned to VAW-110, in May 1988, Rear Admiral Klunder served as flight instructor, Pilot NATOPS Officer, and COMNAVAIRPAC Evaluator. During this time he was awarded the “1988 Hawkeye of the Year”. In June 1989, he reported to Patuxent River, MD where he completed one year at the U.S. Naval Test Pilot School and two years with the Force Warfare Test Directorate. During this assignment, he was awarded the “1991 Test Pilot of the Year”, established 21 world flying records, and obtained a Masters in Aerodynamics and Aviation Systems from the Univ. of Tennessee. From October 1992 to February 1995, he served in Japan as the Safety Officer and Maintenance Officer for the “Liberty Bells” of VAW-115. His tour included one Operation Southern Watch deployment and multiple surge operations to the Western Pacific. He next served as the Senior Operations Officer and SIOP Officer for the Joint Staff J-3/National Military Command Center in the Pentagon. During this tour, he was involved in such operations as Joint Endeavor, Desert Strike, and the Scott O'Grady rescue.

In October 1997, Rear Admiral Klunder again reported to Japan and VAW-115 as Executive Officer and continued with command of the “Liberty Bells” from January 1999 to May 2000. During his command tour, VAW-115 received the Battle E, AEW Excellence and Golden Anchor awards. Following command, he reported to the National War College and graduated with a Masters in Strategic Studies in June 2001.

Rear Admiral Klunder was then assigned as a Joint Staff Liaison Officer to the U.S. State Department. There he was the Middle East Section Chief for Political-Military Affairs and heavily involved in diplomatic and coalition efforts for Operations Enduring Freedom and Iraqi Freedom. During this tour, he received the “2002 George C. Marshall Statesman” award and screened for command of CVW-2. He completed an assignment as CAOC Deputy Director from August 2003 to November 2003 at Al Udeid AB in Qatar and reported as Deputy Commander, Carrier Air Wing TWO in November 2004. He assumed command of Carrier Air Wing TWO on 24 February 2006. During his tour, he completed two CVW-2 Western Pacific/Indian Ocean deployments with highlights including Tsunami and Hurricane Katrina Relief and Exercises Valiant Shield, Foal Eagle, RIMPAC, and Jaded Thunder.

In September 2007, Rear Admiral Klunder reported to OPNAV staff where he served as Deputy Director for Information, Plans and Security under N3/5.

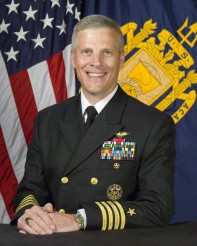
Matthew L. Klunder while serving as Commandant of the United States Naval Academy.

In May 2008, he was selected as the 83rd Commandant of Midshipmen at the U.S. Naval Academy. Klunder was selected in 2009 for promotion to rear admiral, and was relieved as commandant of midshipmen by Captain Robert E. Clark II on 17 April 2010. Rear Admiral Klunder pinned on his first star on 28 May 2010.

Klunder served as Chief of Naval Research from 2011 until December 2014. He retired at the end of this assignment.

== Notable Achievements ==
- Rear Admiral Klunder has accumulated over 5,800 flight hours and 750 arrested landings while flying over 45 different aircraft. His awards include the Legion of Merit, Defense Meritorious Service Medal (2), Meritorious Service Medal (2), Joint Commendation Medal (2), Navy Commendation Medal (4), and various unit and campaign awards.
- Rear Admiral Klunder was the Commander of the Carrier Air Group during the filming of the now famous video "Pump it" (https://www.youtube.com/watch?v=DqaWdkdFb3Y). He is featured numerous times throughout the film.

Military offices
Preceded by Margaret D. Klein	Commandant of Midshipmen; 83rd	Succeeded by Robert E. Clark II
