= Nevin Carr =

United States Navy admiral

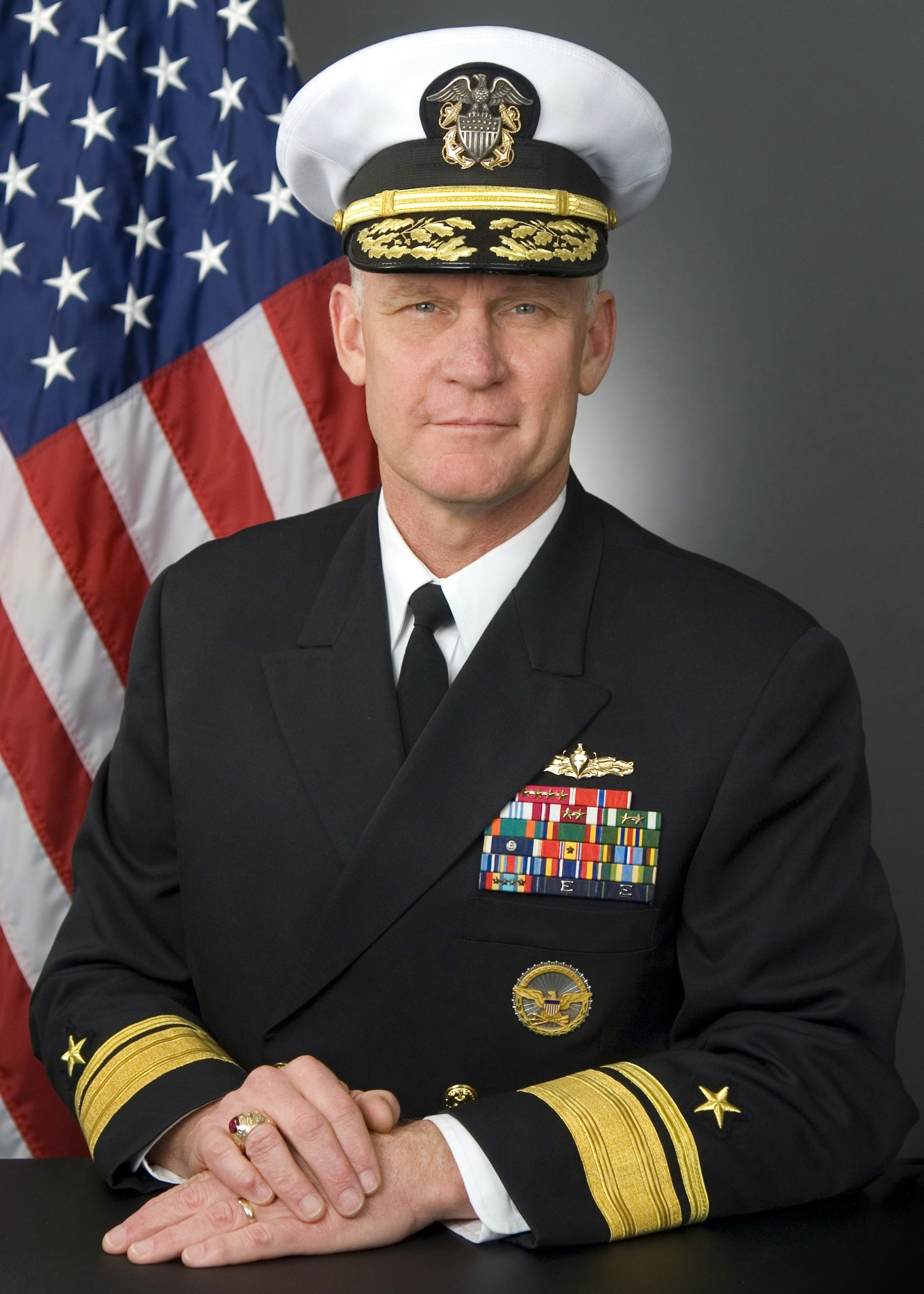
- Official U.S. Navy portrait
- Born: 17 November 1956 (age 69); Rhode Island, U.S.
- Allegiance: United States
- Branch: United States Navy
- Service years: 1979–2012
- Rank: Rear Admiral
- Commands: USS Arleigh Burke; USS Cape St. George; Chief of Naval Research
- Conflicts: Operation Iraqi Freedom

Rear Admiral Nevin Palmer Carr Jr. (born 17 November 1956) is a retired U.S. Navy admiral who served as Chief of Naval Research.

== Biography ==
Carr graduated in 1979 from the U.S. Naval Academy with a Bachelor of Science in naval architecture. He earned a Master of Science in operations research from the Naval Postgraduate School in 1986, and attended the six-week Advanced Management Program at Harvard Business School.

Carr spent much of his Navy career at sea in cruisers and destroyers, on operations across the world. His shipboard tours included King, McCandless, Thomas S. Gates, and Vella Gulf. He served in the Cruiser-Destroyer Group 8 staff embarked in the aircraft carrier Dwight D. Eisenhower, and the 2nd Fleet staff embarked in the command ship Mount Whitney. He commanded the destroyer Arleigh Burke and the cruiser Cape St. George, winning Battle E's and Golden Anchors in both tours. While in command of Cape St. George, The ship participated in combat operations in support of Operation Iraqi Freedom in the European and Central Command theaters.

Ashore, Carr served in the Office of the Secretary of Defense, where he worked on the Arleigh Burke, Ticonderoga, and Seawolf programs, and several Ballistic Missile Defense programs. He later served in the Office of the Chief of Naval Operations as requirements officer for the Aegis Cruiser and Destroyer programs, and was executive assistant to the Commander, U.S. Fleet Forces Command. Following promotion to the flag rank of rear admiral (lower half) in 2006, he was assigned as deputy director of Surface Warfare for Combat Systems and Weapons, and later as Deputy Assistant Secretary of the Navy (International Programs) and director, Navy International Program Office.

In December 2008, he became the 22nd chief of Naval Research, succeeding William E. Landay III, with additional duties as Director, Test and Evaluation and Technology Requirements. While in this position, Carr was in charge of the Navy's wide range of basic and applied research and development programs, a total of about $3 billion in spending. The initiative during his tenure ranged from next-generation advanced weapons such as free-electron lasers and railguns to grants for STEM education programs.

Carr retired from the U.S. Navy in 2012, handing over the post of Chief of Naval Research to Matthew L. Klunder. Immediately after retiring, he worked as a senior advisor for McKinsey & Co, and was a distinguished visiting scholar at Stanford University. In October 2013, he took the position of vice president for Surface Readiness & Future Capability at URS Corporation, a government contractor. In March 2014, he received the Singapore Defence Technology Distinguished Fellowship from the Singapore Ministry of Defence.

== Personal ==
Carr is the son of Nevin Palmer Carr Sr. and Allison Beth (Sandlass) Carr.

The younger Carr married Ann Cary Nelms on 18 July 1981 in Newport News, Virginia.
