= Robert E. Clark II =

United States Navy officer and college president

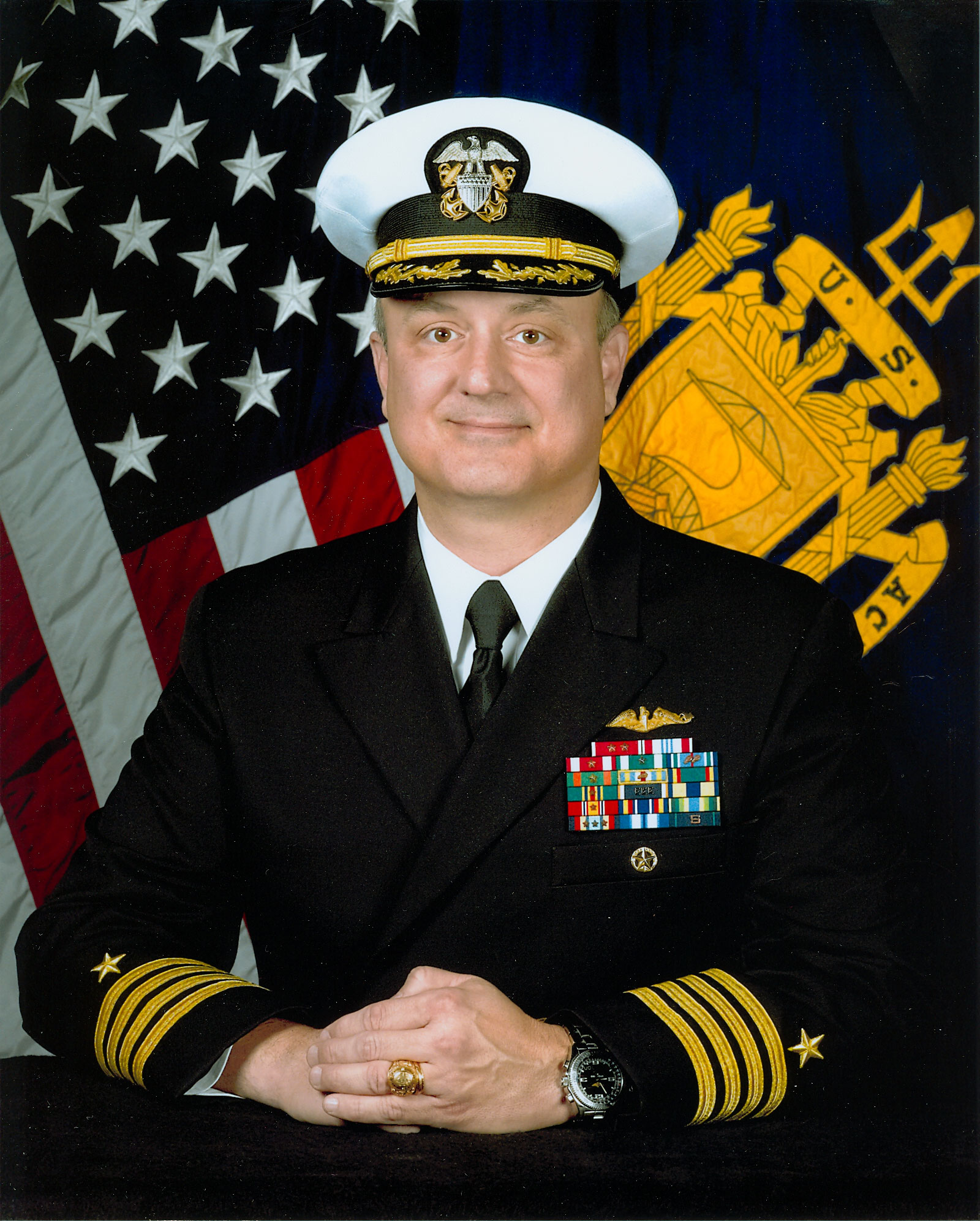
- Clark as 84th Commandant of Midshipmen at the United States Naval Academy

17th President of Wesley College
- Incumbent
- Assumed office July 15, 2015

Personal details
- Born: April 7, 1961 (age 65) St. Petersburg, Florida, U.S.
- Education: United States Naval Academy (BS); Naval Postgraduate School (MS)
- Occupation: College President and Retired Naval Officer

Military service
- Allegiance: United States
- Branch/service: United States Navy
- Years of service: 1979–2015
- Rank: Captain
- Commands: USS Connecticut, SUBRON 4
- Awards: Legion of Merit (5); Defense Meritorious Service Medal; Meritorious Service Medal (2)

Robert Edward Clark II is a retired officer of the United States Navy and the last President of Wesley College in Dover, Delaware.

== Early life and education ==
Clark was born in St. Petersburg, Florida, and was raised in Howell, New Jersey; Ann Arbor, Michigan; and West Chester, Pennsylvania. He graduated from West Chester East High School.

Clark attended the Naval Academy Prep School from 1979 to 1980. He began the United States Naval Academy in 1980, graduating in 1984 with a Bachelor of Science in General Engineering. Clark attended Naval Postgraduate School from 1989 to 1991, earning a Master of Science degree in national security affairs (and received the Naval Institute Award for his thesis). In 2005, he attended the University of North Carolina's Kenan-Flagler Business School (a Navy Corporate Business Course) on executive management. Additionally, he attended the Armed Forces Staff College.

== Career ==
=== Naval career ===
His sea tours included assignments on board USS Batfish (SSN 681), USS Dallas (SSN 700), USS Grayling (SSN 646), USS Hampton (SSN 767), Commander Cruiser Destroyer Group Eight (COMCRUDESGRU 8), and Commanding Officer of USS Connecticut (SSN 22) from August 2001 to September 2003 . During his time as the Commanding Officer, CONNECTICUT received numerous awards including back-to-back unit awards for operations of significant importance to the National Security of the United States, as well as several retention and tactical efficiency awards. His last at sea command was as Commodore, Submarine Squadron FOUR, which during his time in command was the largest fast attack submarine squadron in the Navy.

Ashore he held several senior leadership positions including, Executive Officer of the COMSUBLANT Tactical Readiness and Evaluation Team; Branch Head for Plans, Liaison and Assessments, which is the senior special assistant to the Director of Submarine Warfare; Deputy Executive Assistant, and Executive Assistant, to the Vice Chief of Naval Operations; and 84th Commandant of Midshipmen at the United States Naval Academy from April 2010 to May 2013, where he was the longest standing Commandant in the history of the Naval Academy. His last tour while on active duty before retiring as a Captain (O-6), was as the Joint Service Coordinator, and Commanding Officer of the NROTC Unit, at Penn State. This was a unique, and temporary, assignment that allowed Clark the opportunity to serve in a senior leadership role at a major university while transitioning from active duty.

=== Education administrator ===
Clark served as 17th and final president of Wesley College in Dover, Delaware, beginning July 15, 2015. During his time as president, and despite decades of financial challenges and declining enrollment, State funding was secured which enabled the college to continue operations. Additionally, unlike many colleges across the country that have had to close because of the impacts of the COVID-19 Pandemic, Wesley College was able to maintain operations during the global COVID-19 Pandemic, which allowed the realization of a historic acquisition by Delaware State University in which Wesley College became the Wesley College of Health and Behavioral Sciences.

On March 1, 2021, two months before the acquisition was finalized with Delaware State University, some members of the faculty published a no-confidence resolution against Clark that was forwarded to Wesley College's board of trustees. Wesley College's board of trustees voted unanimously on March 20, 2021, to dismiss the resolution in full support of President Clark’s exceptional performance, and leadership. Additionally, the board of trustees voted unanimously, to bestow upon President Clark the title president emeritus in recognition of his leadership, and service to the college and the community.

President Joe Biden appointed Clark to the United States Naval Academy's board of visitors, along with five other distinguished national leaders, on February 7, 2022.

== Awards ==
- 2007 Inductee into the West Chester East High School Hall of Fame
- David Lloyd Award for Tactical Excellence & Leadership
- Naval Institute Award for Master's Thesis
- Legion of Merit - 5 Awards
- Defense Meritorious Service Medal
- Meritorious Service Medal - 2 Awards
- Navy and Marine Corps Commendation Medal - 6 Awards
- Joint Service Achievement Medal - 3 Awards
- Navy and Marine Corps Achievement Medal - 2 Awards
- Numerous Unit Awards
