= Ryan Mac =

Vietnamese-American writer

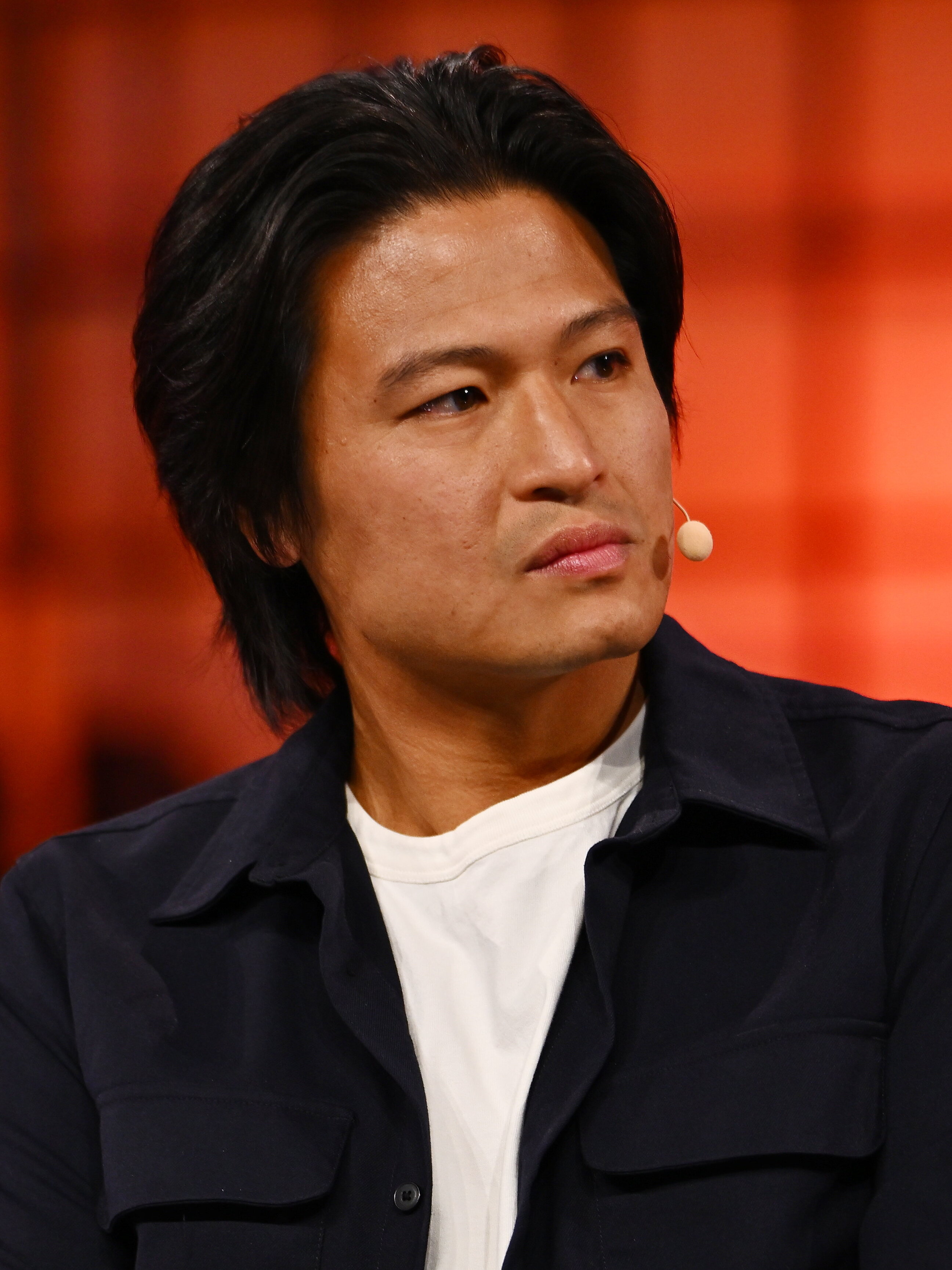
- Mac in 2024
- Education: Stanford University (BA)
- Occupations: Journalist, writer
- Writing career
- Notable work: Character Limit: How Elon Musk Destroyed Twitter (2024)
- Notable awards: Mirror Award (2019); George Polk Award in Journalism (2020)
- Website: Ryan Mac - The New York Times

Ryan Mac is a Vietnamese-American writer and journalist who works for The New York Times. He has previously worked as a reporter at BuzzFeed News and Forbes. Mac was awarded the 2019 Mirror Award and the 2020 George Polk Award for his reporting on Facebook. He is the co-author of 2024's Character Limit: How Elon Musk Destroyed Twitter.

== Education ==
Ryan Mac attended Stanford University from 2007 to 2011. Initially a pre-med student, Mac began writing stories for the Stanford Daily at the end of his freshman year. As a staff writer, Mac often published about new musical releases and music festivals for the Daily's arts section.

Throughout college, Mac served as a reporting intern at the Half Moon Bay Review, New York Times, Bay Citizen, OC Register, and Bloomberg L.P.

== Career ==
From 2011 to 2017, Mac worked as a staff writer for Forbes, compiling their annual list of billionaires before transitioning into covering tech startups and companies. Mac also continued to cover music, interviewing top-earning DJs such as Calvin Harris, Steve Aoki, and Avicii, and American rapper Riff Raff in 2014. In 2016, Mac reported on Peter Thiel, who had been secretly funding Hulk Hogan's lawsuit against Gawker (Bollea v. Gawker). Alongside reporter Matt Drange, Mac was a 2017 Gerald Loeb Award finalist in the 'Breaking News Category' for their coverage of Gawker.

From 2017 to 2021, Mac worked as a senior technology reporter for BuzzFeed News. In 2018, Mac reported on Elon Musk and Vernon Unsworth, a British cave diver who played an instrumental role in the Tham Luang cave rescue. Mac released a series of email correspondences that revealed Musk had accused Unsworth of being a "child rapist" who had "married a child". Both these claims by Musk were found to be false. In one of Musk's emails to BuzzFeed News, he referred to Mac as a "f**king asshole". These emails were later referenced during Unsworth's $190 million defamation suit against Musk.

Mac was one of ten journalists whose accounts were suspended on X (formerly Twitter) by Elon Musk on December 15, 2022. Mac's Twitter account was unsuspended by Musk two days later.

In September 2024, Mac and co-author Kate Conger released Character Limit: How Elon Musk Destroyed Twitter, which covers Musk's $44-billion-dollar acquisition of Twitter.

== Personal life ==
Ryan Mac is an avid supporter of Arsenal Football Club.
