= Kate Conger =

American writer and journalist (born 1989)

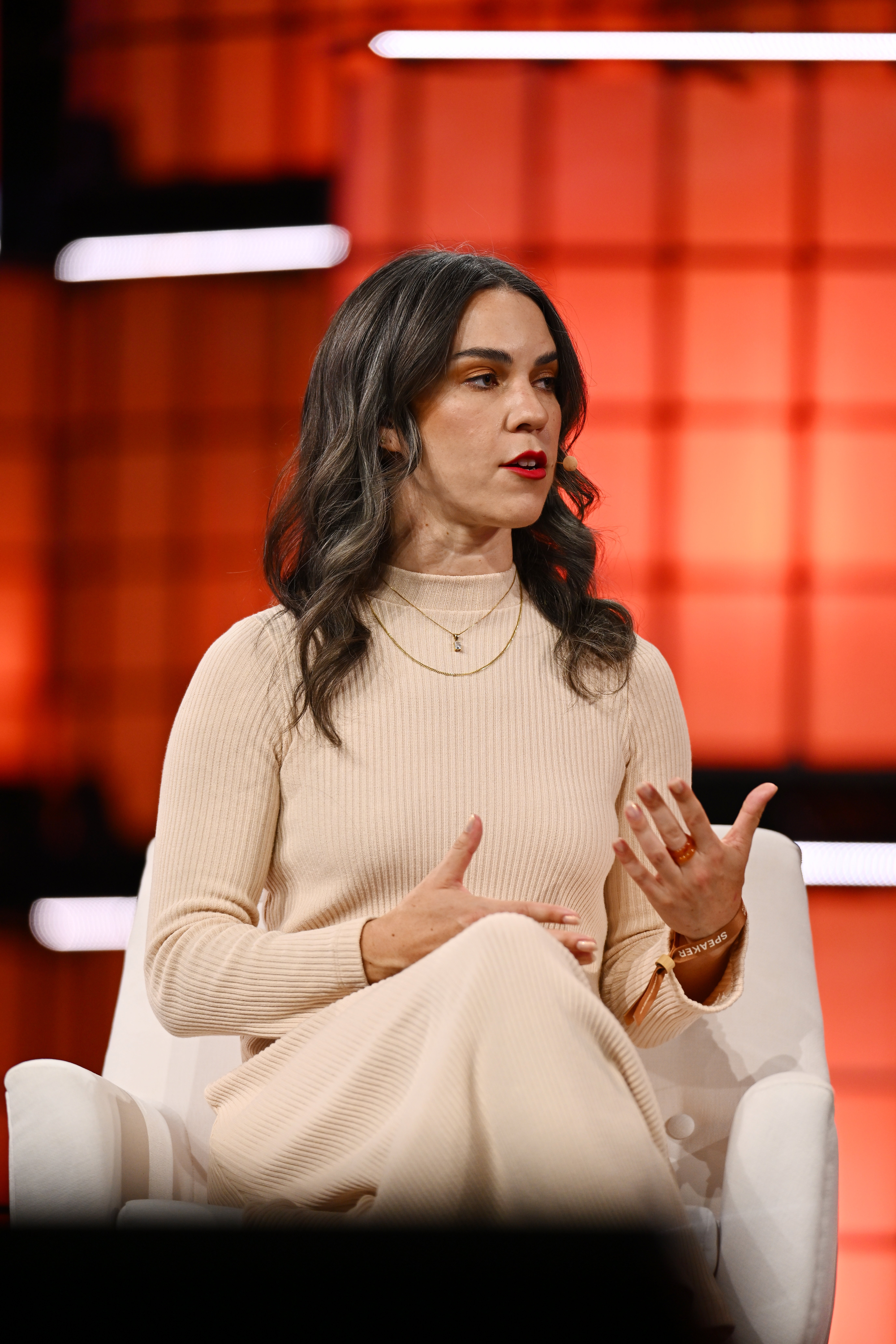
- Conger in November 2024
- Born: Kate Adelia Conger; April 1989 (age 37)
- Occupations: Journalist; writer
- Employer: The New York Times
- Website: Kate Conger - New York Times

Kate Adelia Conger (born April 1989) is an American journalist and writer who works for The New York Times. She has previously worked as a reporter at Gizmodo and TechCrunch. She is the co-author of 2024's Character Limit: How Elon Musk Destroyed Twitter.

== Career ==
Conger began her career writing for the SF Weekly and the San Francisco Examiner. From 2016 to 2017, Conger worked as a reporter for TechCrunch, covering tech policy and cybersecurity. From 2017 to 2018, she worked as a reporter for Gizmodo. Conger was the first to report on the infamous Google Memo written by former employee James Damore, in which he disparaged Google for policies addressing gender equality. Damore would later sue Google, alleging discrimination against conservative white men in a suit that was ultimately dismissed in 2020.

Conger joined The New York Times as a writer in July 2018. Along with writers Daisuke Wakabayashi and Katie Benner, Conger was a 2019 Gerald Loeb Award finalist in beat reporting for their coverage of Andy Rubin, a former Google executive who was paid $90 million in severance to expedite his leaving of the company after credible allegations of sexual harassment.

In September 2024, Conger and co-author Ryan Mac released Character Limit: How Elon Musk Destroyed Twitter, which covers Musk's $44-billion-dollar acquisition of Twitter.
