= Public diplomacy of the United States =

Public diplomacy is that "form of international political advocacy in which the civilians of one country use legitimate means to reach out to the civilians of another country in order to gain popular support for negotiations occurring through diplomatic channels."

== Examples ==
=== America ===
George Washington, Benjamin Franklin, and Samuel Adams all exercised public diplomacy in arguing the case of justice for the American colonies. The most notable use of Public Diplomacy by American Founding Fathers was the United States Declaration of Independence in 1776

1914–1918 World War I

1917–1919 – President Wilson created the Committee on Public Information led by advertiser George Creel

1920s – Advent of Radio

1939–1945 World War II

1936 – Roosevelt's Good Neighbor Policy

1938 – The Division of Cultural Relations (State Dept.) – Interdeparmental Committee for Scientific Cooperation (USIA pamphlet) – response to Nazi German and Fascist Italian propaganda aimed at Latin America.

1940 – Nelson Rockefeller's Office of Inter-American Affairs

1941 – U.S. broadcasting 24/7

1941 – Japanese Attack on Pearl Harbor, U.S. enters into WWII → U.S. broadcasting goes global

1942

February – VOA's first broadcast
June – United States Office of War Information (OWI) created by President Franklin Roosevelt
The Office of Strategic Services (OSS) – predecessor to the CIA

1945 – Cold War

OWI terminated
VOA – transferred to the State Department
Founding of Radio Free Europe/Radio Liberty

1946 – The Fulbright Act of 1946 – "Mandated a peacetime international exchange program"

1947 – Fulbright Program founded.

Establishment of the CIA, the Central Intelligence Agency was a successor to the OSS and it proceeded to lend intellectual, legal, and material support to American Public Diplomacy

1948 – U.S. Information and Educational Exchange Act signed by President Harry Truman

Also known as the Smith-Mundt Act, it is a charter addressing America's peacetime overseas information program.

1948 – Congress creates the U.S. Advisory Commission on Public Diplomacy – to advise and make recommendations on the conduct of public diplomacy.

June 1948 – May 1949 – Berlin Blockade

1949 – the Hoover Commission advised the creation of an independent information agency

1950 – Campaign of Truth (Truman)

Aug. 1, 1953 – Eisenhower founded the Independent United States Information Agency (USIA)

the United States Department of State directed educational exchange programs.

1961 – Mutual Educational and Cultural Exchange Act (Fulbright-Hays Act of 1961) – "consolidated various U.S. international educational and cultural exchange activities. It expanded other cultural and athletic exchanges, translation of books and periodicals, and U.S. representation in international fairs and expositions. The Act also established government operation of cultural and education centers abroad."

1961–1964 – Edward R. Murrow appointed USIA director. He states, "Truth is the best propaganda."

1962 – Cuban Missile Crisis

1977–1978 – the State Department's Bureau of Educational and Cultural Affairs is combined with USIA to create the United States International Communication Agency (USICA) Carter issues second mandate for USIA/USICA: "to reduce the degree to which misperceptions and misunderstandings complicate relations between the United States and other nations. It is also in our interest—and in the interest of other nations—that Americans have the opportunity to understand the histories, cultures, and problems of others, so that we can come to understand their hopes, perceptions, and aspirations."

1978 – VOA folded into USIA/USICA

1982 – Reagan restored the name to USIA

1987 – Reagan's tear down this wall! speech at the Brandenburg Gate in Berlin, Germany.

1989 – Year of Miracles:

Solidarity (Polish trade union)

1990 – amendment to U.S. Information and Educational Exchange Act – authorized USIA director to "make certain products available to the Archivist of the United States for domestic distribution". But only 12 years after the fact.

1994 – United States International Broadcasting Act

1998 – Foreign Affairs Restructuring and Reform Act of 1998

States that – USIA will be integrated with the Department of State as of October 1, 1999, moving public diplomacy closer to the center of U.S. foreign policymaking.

1999 – USIA abolished and full authority given to the State Department's Undersecretary of State for Public Diplomacy and Public Affairs

VOA is put under the direction of the bipartisan Broadcasting Board of Governors

2001 – September 11 – Terrorist attacks against the United States. Subsequent invasion of Afghanistan.

2002 – Strategic communication Policy coordinating Committee established.

2003 – Invasion of Iraq

2007–2008 – Counter-Terrorism Communication Center established – replaced by Global Strategic Engagement Center.

== Important legislation ==
The following four acts provide the foundational legislative authority for public diplomacy as practiced by the U.S. government:

First: The State Department's basic authorities Act of 1956

- - Authorizes six Under Secretaries of State for the United States Department of State and requires the existence of an Undersecretary of State for Public Diplomacy and Public Affairs.

Second: The United States Information and Educational Exchange Act of 1948 (Smith-Mundt Act)

- authorizes the Secretary of state to "Prepare and disseminate 'information about the United States, its people, and its policies, through press, publications, radio, motion pictures, and other information media, and through information centers and instructors abroad.'"
- ~ the controversy of the Smith-Mundt Act, pertains to Section 501 which, "unlike previous government public information efforts, prohibits materials developed under the authorities of this Act from being disseminated within the United States, its territories, or possessions"
  - - Matt Armstrong articulates the dilemma:

The law imposes a geographic segregation of audiences between those inside the U.S. and those outside it, based on the fear that content
aimed at audiences abroad might "spill over" into the U.S. This not only shows a lack of confidence and understanding of U.S. public
diplomacy and international broadcasting, it also ignores the ways in which information and people now move across porous, often non-
existent borders with incredible speed and ease, to both create and empower dynamic diasporas...No other country, except perhaps North
Korea and China, prevents its own people from knowing what is said and done in their name.

Third: The Mutual Educational and Cultural Exchange Act of 1961 (Fulbright-Hays Act of 1961)

- This act "authorizes U.S. exchange programs as a public Diplomacy tool"

Fourth: The United States International Broadcasting Act of 1994

- Reorganizes U.S. non-military international broadcasting
- Creates nine-member Broadcasting Board of Governors (BBG)under which it places all U.S. international broadcasting.
- "Charges the Secretary of State and the BBG with respecting the professional independence and integrity of the international Broadcasting Bureau, its broadcasting services, and the grantees of the board."

== U.S. Information Agency (USIA) ==
USIA supported a coordinated and extensive approach to public diplomacy. As Kathy Fitzpatrick sums up:

USIA's presence was felt in all corners of the world. Thousands of public diplomacy specialists were stationed in more than 175
countries. The Voice of America was broadcasting to 100 million people weekly. USIA was producing books and magazines in more than 100
languages. The agency was operating a global library network in 150 countries, teaching English to thousands of foreign citizens, hosting
exhibits depicting American ideals that drew billions of visitors, producing films and programs widely popular in other nations, and
administering cultural and euducational exchange programs in which millions of world citizens participated. According to USIA veteran
Wilson P. Dizard Jr., "it was the biggest information and cultural effort ever mounted by one society to influence the attitudes and
actions of men and women beyond its borders."

Therefore, a piece of legislation which had serious ramifications for American Public Diplomacy was the Foreign Affairs Restructuring and Reform Act of 1998 which folded USIA into the State Department and put all International Broadcasting in the hands of the BBG.

== In the 21st century ==
=== Structure ===
In a 2008 survey of USIA alumni, Kathy Fitzpatrick surmised, "Notwithstanding increased funding for public diplomacy in the Middle East after 9/11 and despite dozens of reports by government and private organizations calling for substantial improvements in public diplomacy capabilities, American public diplomacy remains underfunded, undervalued, and underutilized."

Since 1999, the Foreign Affairs Restructuring and Reform Act of 1998, also known as The Consolidation Act, abolished USIA and transferred its functions (information, cultural, and educational operations) to the United States Secretary of State and the United States State Department. Specifically, these functions fall under the leadership of the Undersecretary of State for Public Diplomacy and Public Affairs.
On the other hand, the Consolidation Act also established the BBG as an "independent entity within the executive branch." U.S. International Broadcasting continues to play a vital role in American public diplomacy. As former president of the BBG and 2008 undersecretary of state for public diplomacy, James K. Glassman says, "U.S. international broadcasting is America's largest civilian public diplomacy program, and one that "provides a lifeline to people seeking the truth" in many closed societies."

An organizational chart of Public Diplomacy within the Department of State is available on pg. 19 of the 2009 report by CRS (Congressional Research Service) entitled U.S. Public Diplomacy: Background and Current Issues available online at: https://sgp.fas.org/crs/row/R40989.pdf

On pg. 25 of that same report by CRS, there is an organizational chart of U.S. International Broadcasting under the BBG. Also Available at: https://sgp.fas.org/crs/row/R40989.pdf

=== Issues ===
==== Oversaturation ====
The drawback to modern technology is that there is an oversaturation of information which make it hard to reach and/or move your audience. As Kristin Lord writes,"Despite the extraordinary power of the U.S. government, its public diplomacy activities are, and increasingly will be, only a fraction of the many images and bits of information citizens around the world receive every day. Moreover, they are only one part of the many ways America – through its culture, products, services, philanthropy, people, and media – reaches foreign publics. That does not reduce public diplomacy's importance; perhaps it increases it. But we need to maintain our perspective."

==== U.S. Advisory Commission on Public Diplomacy ====
Established under section 604 of the United States Information and Exchange Act of 1948, the Commission "appraises U.S. Government activities intended to understand, inform, and influence foreign publics." The charter is available online.

The 2008 report, entitled Getting the People Part Right, addressed the effect of human resources on public diplomacy. The report concluded:

The Commission believes that we can significantly enhance the quality and effectiveness of our nation's
outreach to foreign publics by: recruiting for the public diplomacy career track in a more focused way;
testing our recruitees more thoroughly and methodically for their PD instincts, knowledge and skills;
training them more intensively in the core PD skill-set of persuasive communication; and evaluating them
more on communication and less on administration.”

The 2010 report, entitled Assessing U.S. Public Diplomacy: A Notional Model, was a report based on work done at the direction of the U.S. Advisory Commission on Public Diplomacy by the Lyndon B. Johnson School of Public Affairs at The University of Texas at Austin. The report addressed the method of measuring the effectiveness of U.S. Public Diplomacy. Its contents may be summed up as follows: the thermometer is broken, it doesn't work. Moreover, the concluding remarks of the introductory letter from the Commission members offers more insight as to the state of public diplomacy than the actual contents of the report:

“We offer an observation about the Commission and its work. We fully appreciate that the Commission is
charged by the President and the Congress to undertake important advisory and oversight work in
connection with public diplomacy; this work has been made all the more important following the 9/11
attacks on our nation and the imperative of conducting thoughtful, effective public diplomacy in support
of our policy objectives. We have been frustrated at times by limitations related to re-authorization,
funding, staffing and access to department officials.”

==== V. extremist Islamic propaganda ====
The 9/11 Commission makes the following assessment:The enemy is not Islam, the great world faith, but a perversion of Islam. The enemy goes beyond al Qaeda to include the radical ideological movement, inspired in part by al Qaeda, that has spawned other terrorist groups and violence. thus our strategy must match our means to two ends: dismantling the al Qaeda network and, in the long term, prevailing over the ideology that contributes to Islamist terrorism."

Steven Corman, professor at Arizona State University and director of that school's Consortium for Strategic Communication (http://comops.org/) states that the U.S. must “engage the narrative in the new media. … We should be able to do that better than any terrorist group.”

The conflict between the U.S. and Extremist Islamic groups is fundamentally a conflict of ideas. It is a battle for truth. As Patricia Harrison, assistant Secretary of State for Educational and Cultural Affairs, asserted, "if we do not define ourselves, others will do it for us."

==== U.S. v. China ====
On February 15, 2011, a minority staff report was submitted to the United States Senate Committee on Foreign Relations. In the letter of transmittal, ranking member Richard Lugar stated: In the same way that our trade with China is out of balance, it is clear to even the casual observer that when it comes to interacting directly with the other nation's public we are in another lop-sided contest. China has a vigorous public diplomacy program, based on a portrayal of an ancient, benign China that is, perhaps, out of touch with modern realities. Nonetheless, we are being overtaken in this area of foreign policy by China, which is able to take advantage of America's open system to spread its message in many different ways, while using its fundamentally closed system to stymie U.S. efforts.

In the arena of public diplomacy, the report cites China's continued suppression of freedom of speech and freedom of information within their country esp. via the internet. The key means of communication which remains open to the U.S., i.e. individual interaction, is an opportunity which the U.S. has failed to promote. The report cites two significant failures on the part of U.S. public diplomacy:

1. The U.S. has five American centers in all of China. This compared to the seventy some Confucius Institutes throughout the United States.
2. The Shanghai World Expo was a brilliant opportunity for the U.S., however, while "more than 7,000,000" Chinese visited the U.S. Pavilion, the U.S. was criticized for its "hastily organized presentations and lack of a cogent message."

In a survey of Arab youth conducted by a Dubai-based public relations firm in 2023, 80 percent of respondents considered China an ally of their country, while 72 percent considered the United States an ally.

== Other government agencies exercising public diplomacy ==
Aside from the State Department, two other government entities have clear foreign policy roles and, accordingly, engage foreign publics through public diplomacy. These are the United States Department of Defense and the United States Agency for International Development

=== United States Department of Defense – strategic communication ===
"Strategic Communications" is the D.O.D. version of "public diplomacy." The D.O.D. defines "strategic communication" as:

focused United States Government efforts to understand and engage key audiences to create, strengthen,
or preserve conditions favorable for the advancement of United States Government interests, policies,
and objectives through the use of coordinated programs, plans, themes, messages, and products
synchronized with the actions of all instruments of national power.

Related activities include:

1. Information Operations (IO)
2. Public affairs (military)
3. Defense Support to Public Diplomacy

Strategic Communications Activities include:

1. Internet – as a battlefield of ideas
2. Human Terrain Teams – providing expert knowledge on foreign societies
3. The Global Maritime Partnership – "deployment of Navy warships and hospital ships to conduct civil-military operations in foreign countries as well as deliver humanitarian assistance."

=== United States Agency for International Development (USAID) ===
USAID plays a significant role in public diplomacy because of its a-political humanitarian bent. As Nakamura writes, "the Agency creates long-standing relationships between the United states and the people of other countries, relationships that are capable of influencing foreign publics to view U.S. policies and actions as beneficial and to cooperate with U.S. government initiatives.
Up-to-date information available at .

== Public diplomacy and the American people ==
The potency of U.S. public diplomacy is integrally connected to the American people. The role of the private sector in American public diplomacy is indispensable. As Kristin Lord writes,

To be most influential, American public diplomacy should tap into and mobilize these private actors as much as possible – as advocated by countless recent reports. This should happen within current official structures. In addition, the United States should find new ways to engage private actors and employ
technology, media, and private sector expertise.

In the end, America must communicate a sense of herself. As Harvard professor Joseph Nye states, the strength of American soft power comes from its ability to "inspire the dreams and desires of others."

== See also ==
- Cultural diplomacy
