= United States International Communications Reform Act of 2014 =

- Long title: To enhance the missions, objectives, and effectiveness of United States international communications, and for other purposes.
- Announced in: the 113th United States Congress
- Sponsored by: Rep. Edward R. Royce (R, CA-39)
- Number of co-sponsors: 8

Codification
- U.S.C. sections affected: 5 U.S.C. § 5315, 5 U.S.C. § 5332, 5 U.S.C. § 5703, 22 U.S.C. § 1461 et seq., 5 U.S.C. § {{{2}}}, and others.
- Agencies affected: Broadcasting Board of Governors, Government Accountability Office, United States Agency for International Development, Executive Office of the President, United States Congress, Director of National Intelligence, United States Department of State, Department of Health and Human Services, United States Department of Defense, Office of the Inspector General of the Department of State, United States Senate

Legislative history
- Introduced in the House as H.R. 4490 by Rep. Edward R. Royce (R, CA-39) on April 28, 2014; Committee consideration by United States House Committee on Foreign Affairs; Passed the House on July 28, 2014 (voice vote)

The United States International Communications Reform Act of 2014 (H.R. 4490) is a bill that would revise U.S. international broadcasting and communications structures, missions, and objectives. The bill would also replace the Broadcasting Board of Governors with the United States International Communications Agency.

The bill was introduced into the United States House of Representatives during the 113th United States Congress.

== Background ==
The Broadcasting Board of Governors (BBG) is an independent federal agency of the United States government responsible for supervising all U.S. government-supported, civilian international media. The mission of the BBG is "to inform, engage, and connect people around the world in support of freedom and democracy." The agency's goal is to "deliver accurate news and information to significant and strategic audiences overseas... and to serve as a trustworthy source of news and as an example of a free, professional press in countries that lack independent media."

According to a series of reports beginning in 2004 and generated by the Government Accountability Office (GAO), the BBG has struggled to live up to its mission. For instance, GAO highlighted a structural issue of the BBG in a 2004 report claiming that "organizationally, the existence of five separate broadcast entities has led to overlapping language services, duplication of program content, redundant newsgathering and support services, and difficulties coordinating broadcast efforts." The report also added that "marketing challenges include outmoded program formats, poor signal delivery, and low audience awareness in many markets."

Employees at the Broadcasting Board of Governors were consistently rated as having the lowest personnel morale in the federal government by the Office of Management and Budget.

Due to cuts in broadcasting to Ukraine and Russia, the United States could not broadcast into Crimea during the annexation of Crimea by the Russian Federation.

== Provisions of the bill ==
This summary is based largely on the summary provided by the Congressional Research Service, a public domain source.

The United States International Communications Reform Act of 2014 would revise U.S. international broadcasting and communications structures, missions, and objectives.

The bill would repeal the United States International Broadcasting Act of 1994, and amends the United States Information and Educational Exchange Act of 1948.

The bill would replace the Broadcasting Board of Governors with the United States International Communications Agency, and establishes in the Agency a Board of Directors and a Chief Executive Officer.

The bill would express the sense of Congress that the Voice of America (VOA): (1) has been an indispensable element of U.S. foreign policy and public diplomacy efforts and should remain the flagship brand of the Agency; and (2) would benefit from a recalibration of federal international broadcasting agencies and resources which would provide it with greater mission focus and flexibility.

The bill would express the sense of Congress that RFE/RL, Incorporated, Radio Free Asia, and the Middle East Broadcasting Network share a common mission with distinct geographic foci, and should therefore be merged into a single organization with distinct marketing brands to provide news and related programming and content in countries where free media are not established.

The bill would consolidate RFE/RL Incorporated, Radio Free Asia, and the Middle East Broadcasting Network into the (non-federal agency) Freedom News Network.

The bill would state that RFE/RL, Incorporated, Radio Free Asia, and the Middle East Broadcasting Network shall remain brand names under which news and related programming and content may be disseminated by the Network.

The bill would set forth Agency, VOA, and Network requirements regarding: (1) duties and authorities, (2) programming and policy objectives, (3) administration and reporting, and (4) coordination.

== Congressional Budget Office report ==
This summary is based largely on the summary provided by the Congressional Budget Office, as ordered reported by the House Committee on Foreign Affairs on April 30, 2014. This is a public domain source.

H.R. 4490 would make several changes to U.S. non-military international broadcasting and would permanently authorize appropriations for that purpose. It would consolidate into two separate entities the federal and nonfederal entities currently providing such broadcasting, amend the principles and mission underlying international broadcasting, and place restrictions on hiring personnel at the consolidated federal entity.

The Congressional Budget Office (CBO) estimates that implementing H.R. 4490 would cost $3.7 billion over the 2015-2019 period, assuming appropriation of the necessary amounts. Pay-as-you-go procedures apply to this legislation because it would affect direct spending; however, CBO estimates that those effects would not be significant. Enacting the bill would not affect revenues.

H.R. 4490 contains no intergovernmental or private-sector mandates as defined in the Unfunded Mandates Reform Act and would not affect the budgets of state, local, or tribal governments.

== Procedural history ==
The United States International Communications Reform Act of 2014 was introduced into the United States House of Representatives on April 28, 2014, by Rep. Edward R. Royce (R, CA-39). The bill was referred to the United States House Committee on Foreign Affairs, which voted unanimously on April 30, 2014, to approve the bill. On July 18, 2014, the bill was reported (amended) alongside House Report 113-541. The House voted on July 28, 2014, to pass the bill in a voice vote.

== Debate and discussion ==
Supporters of the bill expressed concern that if Congress did not take the chance now to reform the Board, Congress would end up giving up and ending the program.

A The Washington Post editorial board editorial accused the bill of taking "a dangerous step toward converting the most venerable and listened-to U.S. outlet, Voice of America, into another official mouthpiece." The editorial board expressed their concern that Voice of America (VOA) would lose its independent voice, but supported the reorganization of VOA and the related news groups. In a reply, Rep. Ed Royce argued that "the real 'dangerous step' would be to do nothing" to address the problems the BBG is facing.

== See also ==
- List of bills in the 113th United States Congress
