= Patsy Widakuswara =

Radio and broadcast journalist

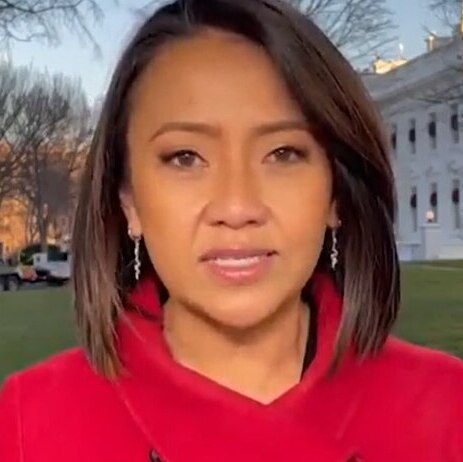
- Widakuswara in 2022
- Education: University of Indonesia, Goldsmiths, University of London
- Occupation: Journalist
- Employer: Voice of America

Patsy Widakuswara is an Indonesian–American radio and broadcast journalist in the United States who covers the White House and U.S. politics. She is the White House Bureau Chief of Voice of America. An incident following VOA news director Robert R. Reilly's interview of Secretary of State Mike Pompeo resulted in her removal from the White House beat and subsequent reinstatement 11 days later. Widakuswara was a lead plaintiff in a successful case to overturn a Presidential order that the Voice of America should be shut down in March 2025.

== Early life and education ==
Widakuswara was born in Indonesia, and grew up in Jakarta. She has a bachelor's degree in International Relations from the University of Indonesia and completed a master's in Journalism from Goldsmiths College, University of London.

== Career ==
Widakuswara has worked in broadcasting and radio in Indonesia, the United Kingdom, and the United States since the 1990s. She began working at Voice of America (VOA) in 2003 as a producer and on-air reporter for the Indonesian Service.

In early 2021, Widakuswara covered the Trump administration for VOA.

On January 11, 2021, after VOA news director Robert R. Reilly interviewed Pompeo but did not allow reporters to ask questions, Widakuswara asked Pompeo several questions that he did not answer as he left the building. She was hours later removed from the prestigious White House beat and then reassigned to VOA Indonesian service. The Coalition For Women in Journalism and the White House Correspondents' Association condemned Widakuswara's removal. Widakuswara was reinstated on January 22, 2021.

In September 2023, Widakuswara, while traveling with U.S. vice president Kamala Harris, was temporarily barred by Indonesian security officers during a press event an at ASEAN summit meeting, after she shouted two questions at Indonesia president Joko Widodo; neither of her questions were answered. She was allowed back in after U.S. officials, including Harris, intervened. An Indonesian foreign ministry official later apologized for the incident.

Widakuswara was the VOA's White House Bureau Chief when calls were made for her and her colleague Carol Guensburg to be fired in November 2023. US senators were annoyed that the VOA was refusing to use the term "terrorists" to refer to the Hamas in Gaza. The VOA's line at the time was in line with the BBC's in that they only used the term when it was from a quote. They argued that the word was politicised and the listener should be allowed to decide who was in the wrong and who was in the right.

Widakuswara was a lead plaintiff in a legal case to overturn Trump's executive order who had ordered that the Voice of America should be shut down in March 2025. 1,300 VOA employees were placed on leave. He had already appointed Kari Lake to lead the service. Widakuswara's legal case was upheld in April 2025 as the judge declared that Trump's order "violated the law and Constitution".
