= International Broadcasting Bureau =

US Agency for Global Media tech support

The International Broadcasting Bureau (IBB) is the technical support outlet within the United States Agency for Global Media (USAGM) (former Broadcasting Board of Governors, BBG), which is a U.S. independent agency. The IBB supports the day-to-day operations of Voice of America (VOA) and the Office of Cuba Broadcasting (Radio y Televisión Martí). Moreover, it also provides transmission and technical support for all of the independent non-military broadcasting services funded by the USAGM. The IBB is located in Washington, D.C.

== History ==
On April 30, 1994, President Clinton signed the International Broadcasting Act (Public Law 103-236). The legislation established the International Broadcasting Bureau (IBB) within the United States Information Agency (USIA), and created a Broadcasting Board of Governors (BBG) with oversight authority over all non-military U.S. government international broadcasting.

The Voice of America, the oldest and best-known organization within the BBG, was the first broadcast news organization to offer continuously updated programming on the Internet.

When USIA was disbanded in October 1999, the IBB and BBG were established as independent federal government entities, with the IBB as an administrative vehicle under the BBG containing VOA, Radio and TV Martí, the Office of Engineering and Technical Services, and a number of support services.

Other international broadcasting services supervised by the USAGM are constituted as private corporations and are not part of the IBB.
These include:

- Radio Sawa and Al Hurra television (Arabic),
- Radio Farda (Persian to Iran),
- Radio Free Europe/Radio Liberty (RFE/RL)
- Radio Free Asia (RFA).

Currently, the VOA and the IBB continue to operate shortwave radio transmitters and antenna farms at one site in the United States, located near Greenville, North Carolina.

== Director ==
The position of IBB Director is appointed by the president of the United States, with Senate confirmation.

The last IBB Director was Richard M. Lobo, who was appointed by President Barack Obama and confirmed by the Senate in September 2010. He retired in November 2013 as the longest-serving IBB Director. During his tenure, he implemented a management restructuring plan under which the responsibilities of the IBB Director were transferred to a new CEO of the BBG.

=== Past directors ===
Previously, the directorship was held by Seth Cropsey (December 9, 2002—2004). Appointed by the BBG, Brian Conniff served as acting director from April 1999 to December 2002. Joseph B. Bruns was the first director of IBB, he served from 1994 until 1995. Bruns previously had been Acting Associate Director of Broadcasting of USIA and Acting Director of VOA.

== See also ==
- International broadcasting
- Shortwave
- Radio Canada International
- Media of the United States
