= International Broadcasting Bureau Greenville Transmitting Station =

Transmitting station for Voice of America

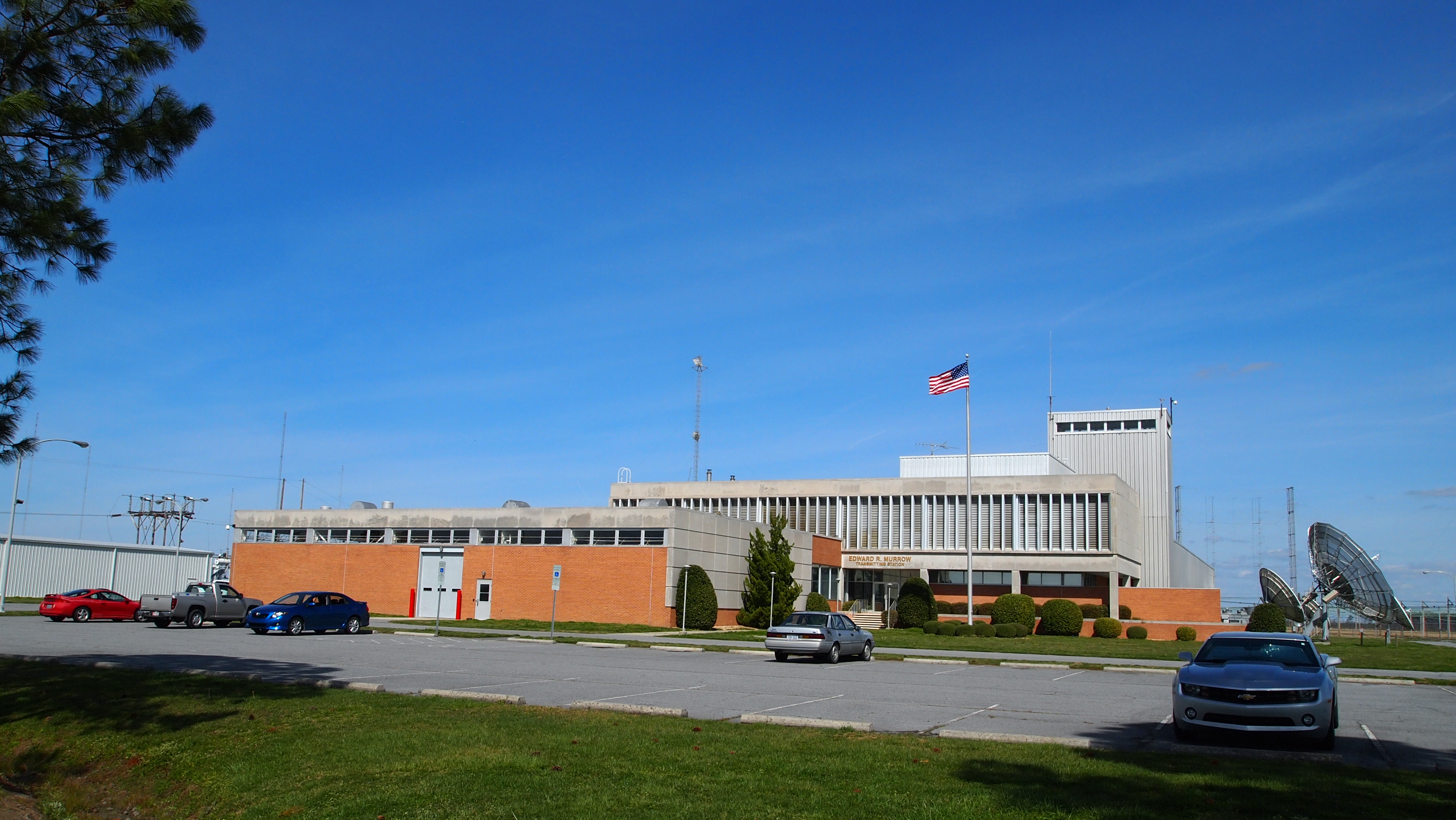
Site B facilities, Greenville Transmitting Station

The International Broadcasting Bureau Greenville Transmitting Station is the transmitting station for Voice of America, in Greenville, North Carolina. It is also known as the Edward R. Murrow Transmitting Station or Voice of America Greenville Transmitting Station. Greenville was chosen because of its remoteness from other communication services, proximity of large quantities of reliable electric power, type of terrain and suitability for construction, and availability of property which ensured the best electronic propagation conditions. The transmitting station provided shortwave broadcasts for U.S. government-funded, nonmilitary and international broadcasting. On March 16, 2025 the station's transmitters were shut down. The main target areas for the station's shortwave broadcasts were Latin America, Cuba, the Caribbean, North Africa, and Africa.

== History ==
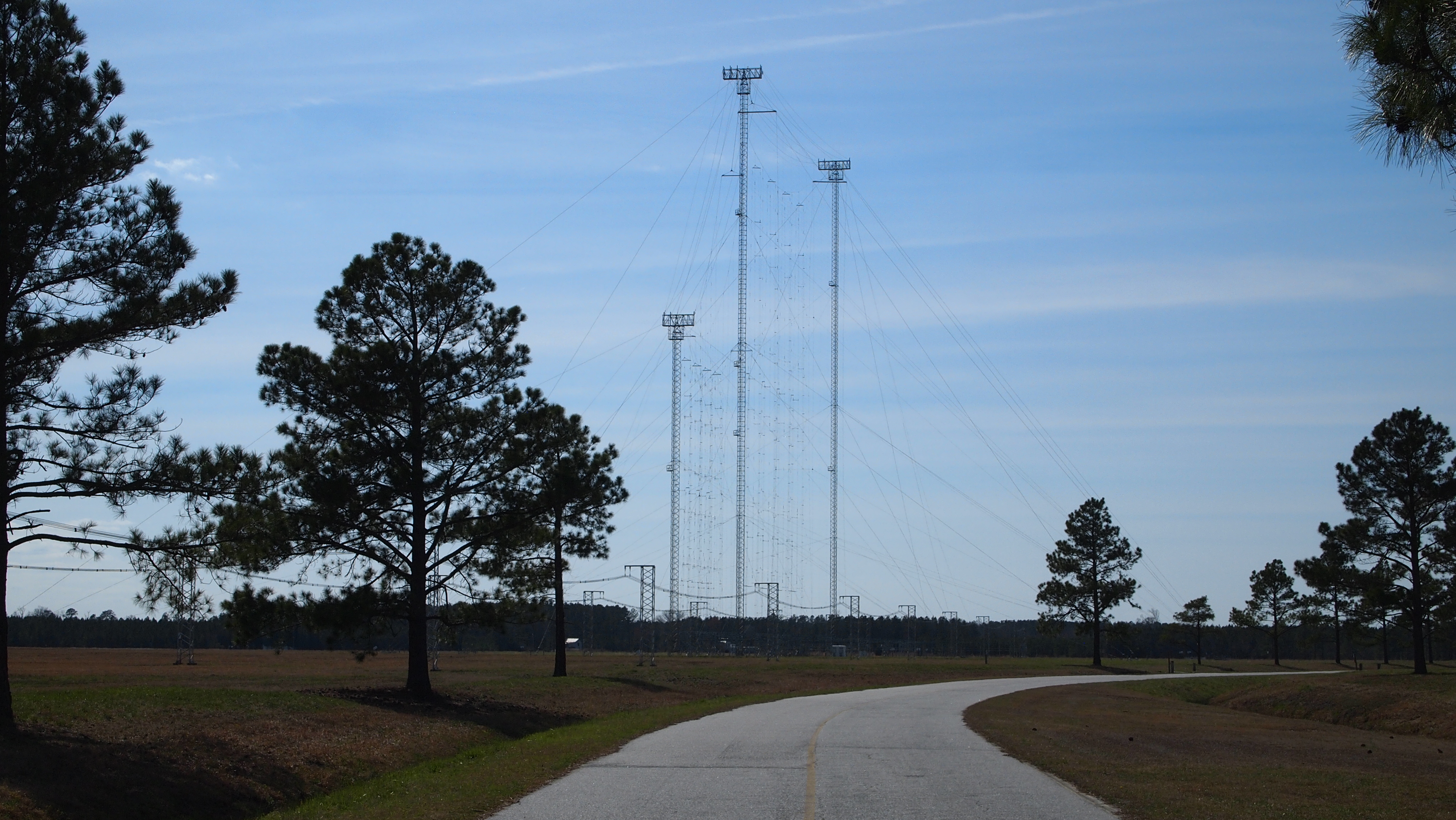
Site B broadcast towers, Greenville Transmitting Station

In the early 1950s, VOA planned for the construction of a high-power shortwave complex on the East Coast of the United States to provide coverage to Europe, Africa, and South America. By 1954, the project was suspended, but the need continued to grow. The transmitters in Wayne, New Jersey, and Brentwood and Schenectady, New York continued to become more inadequate every year. Congress gave approval for a new transmission station in 1958. That same year site exploration found 38 potential locations. Final selection was made a year later, and the land was acquired. The site had to be south enough to avoid the northern auroral zone, but close enough to Washington D.C. to keep transmitting cost to a minimum. Because of the number of transmitters needed, it was decided to split the transmission site into two, site A and site B. The receiving facilities, program master control, communications center, and station main offices were located at site C. Construction began on February 15, 1960 and was completed December 7, 1962, at a cost of $23–24 million. All three stations were dedicated by President John F. Kennedy and became operational on February 8, 1963. The new facilities doubled the VOA's power and employed 100 people around the clock. The cost was offset by the closure of the transmitters in Wayne, Brentwood, and Schenectady. From January 1988 until mid-1997, the station was the network training facility for new Foreign Service Officers, who spent six months in training at the stations prior to being sent overseas. The Greenville facilities became the most powerful international broadcaster in the world, in both physical size and radio frequency energy. Each of the sites housed nine transmitters – three of 500,000 watts, three of 250,000 watts, and three of 50,000 watts.

President John F. Kennedy's remarks at the dedication ceremony for the United States Information Agency Transmitter Complex in Greenville, North Carolina

It gives me great pleasure to open this dedication of a new transmitter complex of the United States Information Agency. Today is the beginning. More peoples in many new lands will now hear the sound of the voice of this country, the Voice of America.

The radio arm of the United States Information Agency helps to tell America's story abroad. The Voice of America is young in years, but it is experienced in deeds. These powerful new transmitters at Greenville symbolize an advance into a new dimension of responsibility.

The years ahead hold the promise of our telling America's story to people unable to hear it now. Today the voice is strong where once it was weak. Today the Voice of America can better reach those whose masters seek to drown it out with jamming and interference. It is the truth of ideas that this new facility will communicate to an eager world.

A man may die, nations may rise and fall, but an idea lives on. Ideas have endurance without death. In this dawn of the Space Age, Telestar and Relay share the future with these transmitters. Telestar and Relay cannot broadcast directly into a home, but these shortwave transmitters do.

Both they and the satellites will tomorrow help tell our story to the world. To the United States Information Agency I say congratulations to the new Greenville facility. Your burden in the years ahead is one of truth and challenge. I am confident it will be well discharged and free men everywhere will listen to the sound of your words of truth that seek out men and women of the world that wish to listen to the voice of freedom, to the Voice of America

== Site A ==
35.6982°N 77.1477°W

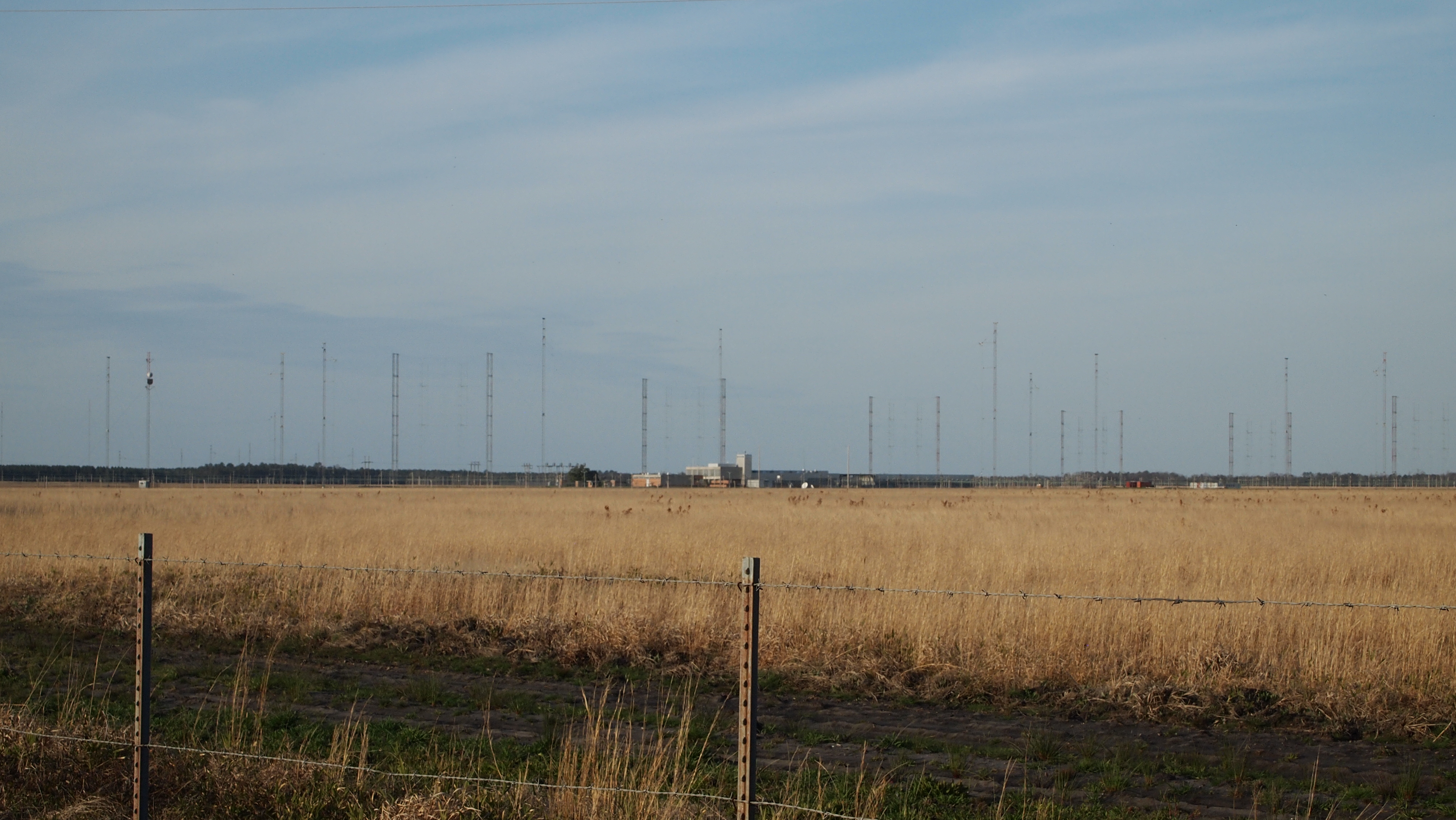
Site A main area, Greenville Transmitting Station

Site A, which comprised 2,821 acres (1,142 ha), is near Beargrass in Beaufort County. Its last use was in 2006. Sites A and B are the only known places where the Henslow's sparrow breeds reliably in North Carolina, ownership was transferred to the North Carolina Wildlife Resources Commission and the remaining antenna structures were demolished. The demolition of the site can be viewed via YouTube.

== Site B ==
35.4707°N 77.1977°W

Site B, which comprises 2,715 acres (1,099 ha), is near BlackJack in Pitt County. Site B broadcasts news and music 24 hours a day to over 125 million people. The project cost around $206 million.

After the 2010 Haiti earthquake, Site B increased their Creole airtime to the Caribbean from two hours to 15 hours a day.

== Site C ==
35.6316°N 77.4844°W

Site C originally had 633 acres (256 ha) near Falkland, North Carolina. This site is the only receiving station in the area. In 1968, this station was rededicated as Edward R. Murrow Transmitting Station, in honor of Edward R. Murrow, former director of the United States Information Agency. In 1971, a private agribusiness, with the help of a local congressman, buried toxic waste from a fire at a chemical storage warehouse. Personnel stopped using the site in 1985. In 1987, the site became a gateway Earth station for the Global Satellite Interconnect System. In 1994, the General Services Administration sold the site, minus 55 acres (22 ha) that contained the toxic waste, to the State of North Carolina and local governments. The site closed on March 31, 1995, due to budget reductions and changes in technology. In 1998, satellite dishes were placed on the Cohen Building in Washington, D.C. Greenville then became a receive-only station and acted as a backup to the headquarters site. It was decommissioned in 1999 and sold to East Carolina University in 2001. Today the land is used by the Department of Biology for research and ROTC for training. There are seven buildings with 33,000 square feet (3,100 m^{2}) of space. Also, the main office of the North Carolina Agromedicine Institute, and a facility for the Office of State Archaeology. Blackbeard's flagship, Queen Anne's Revenge artifacts are being restored there.
