= Robert R. Reilly =

American writer (born 1946)

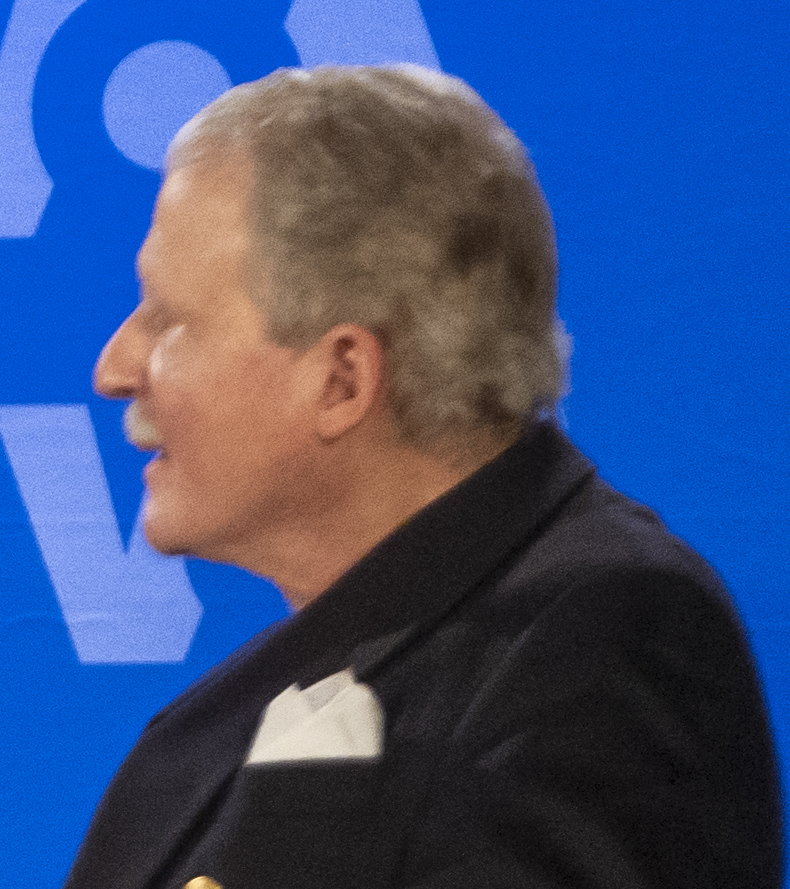
- Born: October 31, 1946 (age 80); United States
- Education: Georgetown University (1968), National Chengchi University (1973), Claremont Graduate School (1978)
- Writing career
- Language: English
- Period: 1983–present
- Subjects: US foreign policy; Islamic extremism and Jihadism

Robert R. Reilly (born October 31, 1946) is a writer, think tank executive and former diplomat. He has published on topics of US foreign policy and the "war of ideas." Reilly is also known as a classical music critic who has written for periodicals including High Fidelity, Musical America, Schwann/Opus, and American Record Guide. In December 2020 Reilly was named director of the Voice of America and he was removed from that post in January 2021 shortly after President Biden's inauguration.

== Career ==
From 1968 to 1970, Reilly served as a tank platoon leader (1st Lieutenant) in the 1/18th Armored Cavalry at Fort Lewis, Washington. He worked in the private sector from 1977 to 1981, and for The Heritage Foundation (1981, 1989) the U.S. Information Agency (1981–1983) and as Special Assistant to President Ronald Reagan during the latter's first term (1983–1985). He was Senior Advisor for Public Diplomacy at the US Embassy in Bern, Switzerland (1985–1988). He produced and hosted a weekly talk-show on foreign policy, On the Line, for Voice of America & Worldnet TV (1990–2001), and was director of Voice of America (2001–2002; 2020–2021).

He acted as Senior Advisor for Information Strategy in the Office of the Secretary of Defense during 2002 to 2006 and as Senior Advisor to the Iraqi Information Ministry during the Iraq War in 2003. In 2007 he was Assistant Professor of Strategic Communications, School for National Security Executive Education, National Defense University.

Reilly in 2010 published The Closing of the Muslim Mind, published by the Intercollegiate Studies Institute. In the book, he draws a connection between the decline of the "rational" theological school of Mu'tazila in favor of the rise of Ash'arism, which would become the mainstream Sunni theology, in the 10th century. The author argues that the widespread acceptance of the Ash'ari school in the Islamic world resulted in "intellectual suicide" that was primary reason for the end of the Islamic Golden Age and the decline of Islamic civilization, transforming Islamic society into a "dysfunctional culture based on a deformed theology" locked in determinism, occasionalism and ultimately fatalism. In his review of the book, Frank Griffel describes it as "war literature", and "a Catholic refutation of Ash'arite Muslim theology", lamenting that Reilly constructs an undue equation between Ash'arism and contemporary Jihadism, while most Jihadists in fact follow Salafism and its more restrictive "traditionalist" school of theology which is hostile towards Ash'arism.

He has repeatedly condemned homosexuality and same-sex marriage, and wrote a book in 2014, Making Gay Okay: How Rationalizing Homosexual Behavior Is Changing Everything.

He is director of the Westminster Institute, a conservative research organization set up in Virginia in 2009. He is a former senior fellow at the American Foreign Policy Council.

On December 9, 2020, USAGM Director Michael Pack appointed Reilly as the Director of VOA. Reilly was removed as the VOA Director on January 21, 2021, shortly after President Joe Biden's inauguration.

== Publications ==
- Justice and War In the Nuclear Age, "The Nature of Today's Conflict," University Press of America, 1983.
- Peace In a Nuclear Age, "In Proportion to What? The Problem With the Pastoral," Catholic University Press, 1986.
- Der Politische Krieg: Die Reale Gefahr, ("The Political War: The Real Danger"), Soviet Global Strategy, Ost-Institut, Switzerland, 1986.
- The New Federalist Papers, "E Pluribus Unum," University Press of America, 1989.
- The Fall of the Wall, editor, Publisher C.L.E.B Gallery, 1990.
- We Hold These Truths, "The Truths They Held," Franciscan University Press, 1991.
- The Catholic Imagination, “The Music of the Spheres,” St. Augustine Press 2003.
- Surprised by Beauty: A Listener's Guide to the Recovery of Modern Music, Revised and Expanded Edition, Ignatius Press 2016.
- The Roots of Islamist Ideology, CRCE Briefing Paper, London, 2006.
- Strategic Influence, IWP Press, 2007.
- The Closing of the Muslim Mind, ISI Books, 2010
- Fighting the Ideological War: Strategies for Defeating Al Qaeda (Public Diplomacy in an Age of Global Terrorism: Lessons from the Past), Westminster Institute conference, 25 May 2011
- Information Operations: Successes and Failures, Westminster Institute, 2013
- Making Gay Okay: How Rationalizing Homosexual Behavior Is Changing Everything, Ignatius Press, 2014.
