= International Broadcasting Act =

U.S. law

- Other short titles: Foreign Relations Authorization Act, Fiscal Years 1994 and 1995; Arms Control and Nonproliferation Act of 1994; Cambodian Genocide Justice Act; Middle East Peace Facilitation Act of 1994; Mike Mansfield Fellowship Act; Nuclear Proliferation Prevention Act of 1994; Protection and Reduction of Government Secrecy Act; Spoils of War Act of 1994
- Long title: An Act to authorize appropriations for the Department of State, the United States Information Agency, and related agencies, to authorize appropriations for foreign assistance programs, and for other purposes.
- Nicknames: Anti-Economic Discrimination Act of 1994
- Enacted by: the 103rd United States Congress
- Effective: April 30, 1994

Citations
- Public law: 103-236
- Statutes at Large: 108 Stat. 382 aka 108 Stat. 432

Codification
- Titles amended: 22 U.S.C.: Foreign Relations and Intercourse
- U.S.C. sections created: 22 U.S.C. ch. 71 § 6201 et seq.

Legislative history
- Introduced in the House as H.R. 2333 by Lee H. Hamilton (D–IN) on June 8, 1993; Committee consideration by House Foreign Affairs, Senate Foreign Relations, House Judiciary; Passed the House on June 22, 1993 (273-144, Roll call vote 252, via Clerk.House.gov); Passed the Senate on February 2, 1994 (92-8 Roll call vote 18, via Senate.gov, in lieu of S. 1281); Reported by the joint conference committee on April 25, 1994; agreed to by the House on April 28, 1994 (agreed voice vote) and by the Senate on April 28, 1994 (agreed unanimous consent); Signed into law by President Bill Clinton on April 30, 1994

The United States International Broadcasting Act of 1994, signed in law in 1994 by U.S. president Bill Clinton, was meant to streamline the U.S. international broadcasting and provide a cost-effective way to continue Radio Free Europe/ Radio Liberty, Voice of America, and Radio Marti. It placed control of the international broadcasting under the United States Information Agency.

== History ==
In 1958, President Eisenhower in an address to the United Nations proposed monitoring radio broadcasts:

I believe that this Assembly should ... consider means for monitoring the radio broadcasts directed across national frontiers in the troubled Near East area. It should then examine complaints from these nations which consider their national security jeopardized by external propaganda.

In the 1960s, President Kennedy to build an international broadcasting arm of the United States to as a way to promote foreign policy and overthrow communism. In 1976, President Gerald Ford signed the Voice of America charter that established it as the leading branch of US international broadcasting.

In 1993, the Clinton Administration proposed cutting the budget for Radio Free Europe and Radio Liberty in order to reduce budget expenditures. However, after working with the Congress, the International Broadcasting Act was born.

== Original law ==
This Act (Public Law 103-236) consolidated all non-military, U.S. Government international broadcast services under a Broadcasting Board of Governors (BBG) and also created the International Broadcasting Bureau (IBB). The BBG is an independent government agency created to replace the Board for International Broadcasting and consolidate Voice of America broadcasting.

In this law, the president appoints one member of the board as the chairman of the board. The Secretary of State also serves on the board.

Besides combining current radio service, this act also created the Radio Free Asia – a network aimed at Burma, China, Cambodia, Laos, North Korea, and Vietnam.

== Congressional updates ==
In September 2009, the 111th Congress amended the International Broadcasting Act to allow a one-year extension of the operation of Radio Free Asia.

In 2002, the Act was amended to include the Radio Free Afghanistan.

In May 1994, the president announce the continuation of Radio Free Asia after 2009 was dependent on its increased international broadcasting and ability to reach its audience.
