= Radio y Televisión Martí =

US radio, television broadcaster to Cuba

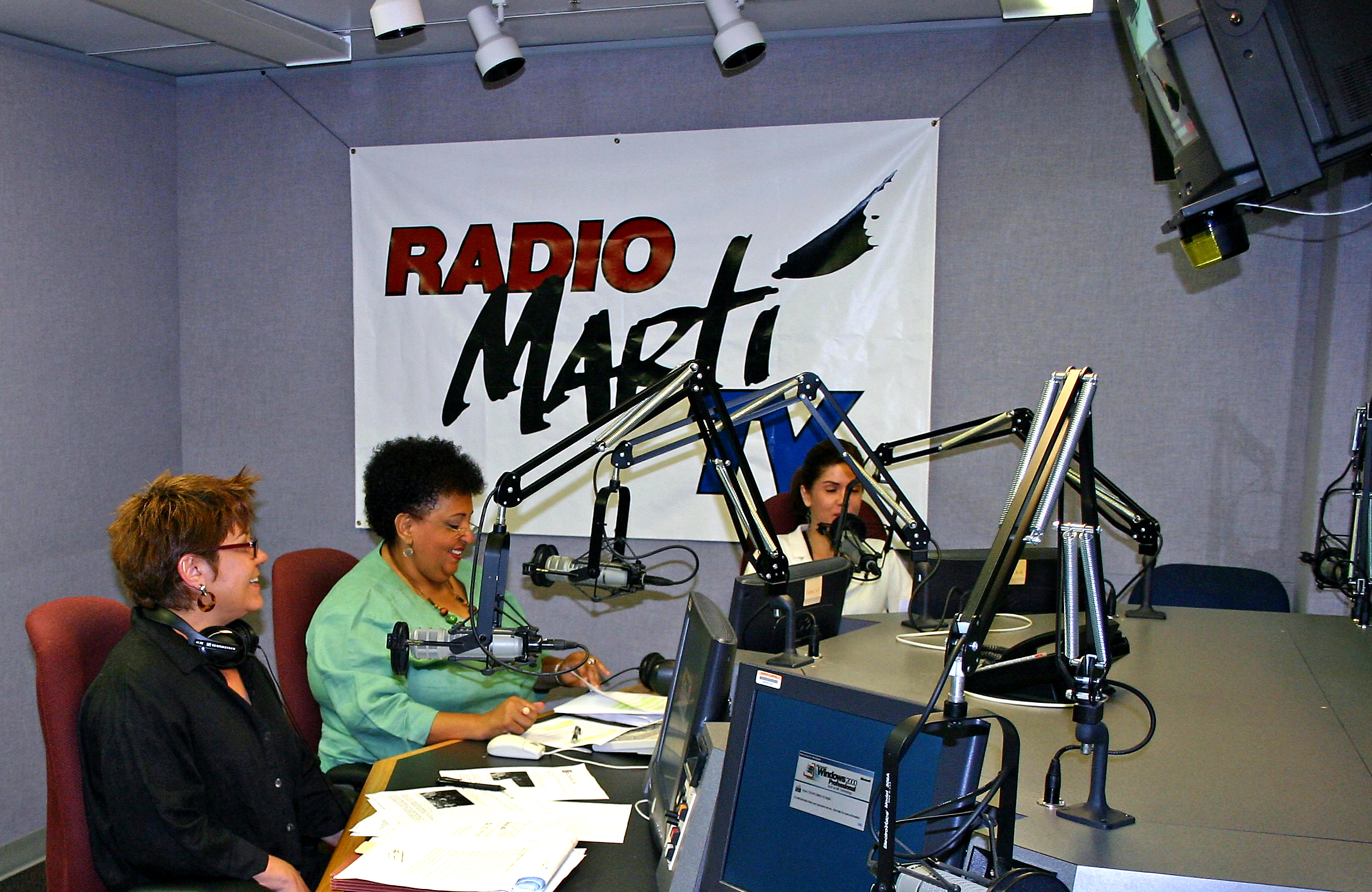
- Radio Martí broadcast studio
- Type: International broadcasting
- Country: United States
- Availability: Americas
- Headquarters: Miami, Florida, United States
- Owner: U.S. Agency for Global Media
- Launch date: May 20, 1985 (radio); March 27, 1990 (television)
- Official website: www.martinoticias.com
- Language: Spanish

Radio y Televisión Martí is an international broadcaster based in Miami, Florida, financed by the federal government of the United States through the U.S. Agency for Global Media (formerly Broadcasting Board of Governors, BBG). It transmits its programs in Spanish to Cuba and its broadcasts can also be heard and viewed worldwide through its website and on shortwave radio frequencies.

Named after the Cuban national hero and intellectual José Martí, Radio Televisión Martí was established in 1983 and TV Martí was added in 1990. The 2014 budget for the Cuba broadcasting program was approximately US$27 million.

Radio y Televisión Martí is overseen by the Office of Cuba Broadcasting (OCB), and is an element of the International Broadcasting Bureau (IBB).

On 14 March 2025, the second Trump administration issued an executive order dismantling the Office of Cuba Broadcasting, the parent agency of the Cuban Broadcasting Bureau, which oversees radio and television. As a result, all Radio Televisión Martí employees were placed on administrative leave with pay, and instructed not to seek to access buildings or computer systems.

On 26 March 2025, the U.S. Agency for Global Media, through its Office for Cuba Broadcasting, notified federal employees, who had been placed on leave on 15 March 2025, that they could return to work at Radio Martí in Doral, Florida.

On 26 March 2025, Radio Martí announced it was returning to the air on X (formerly Twitter), and the Martí Noticias website resumed publishing.

== Radio Martí ==
=== History ===
In the early 1980s, the U.S. Government planned to create a radio station to be known as Radio Free Cuba, modeled on Radio Free Europe/Radio Liberty, the mission of fighting communism in the hope of hastening the fall of Cuban President Fidel Castro. The station – renamed Radio Martí after Cuban writer José Martí, who had fought for Cuba's independence from Spain and against U.S. influence in the Americas – was established in 1983 by President Ronald Reagan at the urging of Jorge Mas Canosa. Existing North American broadcasters objected strenuously to the establishment of Radio Martí, fearing that its broadcasts would lead Cuba to retaliate by jamming existing commercial medium-wave broadcasts from Florida.

On May 20, 1985, Radio Martí began broadcasts to Cuba from the United States. The first day of broadcasting was chosen to commemorate the 83rd anniversary of Cuba's independence from United States rule on May 20, 1902. The fears of broadcasters proved well-founded, when Cuba-based transmitters briefly broadcast powerful signals on the medium-wave band in 1985, disrupting U.S. AM radio station broadcasts in several states. Cuba continues to broadcast interference against U.S. broadcasts specifically directed to Cuba in attempts to prevent them from being received within Cuba.

After the collapse of the Soviet Union at the end of 1991, the budget for all U.S.-government-run foreign broadcasters, with the exception of Radio Martí, was sharply reduced. In 1996, Radio Martí's studios were moved from Washington, D.C. to Miami, Florida. The move, in addition to placing the station's studios closer to its target audience, also underscored its growing independence from the Voice of America, another U.S.-government-run foreign broadcaster with which Radio Martí had previously shared studios.

=== Today ===
Today, Radio Marti broadcasts a 24-hour radio program over short-wave transmitters in Greenville, North Carolina, and a medium-wave transmitter in Marathon, Florida (GC: 24°41′58″N 81°5′19″W). Its studios are located in Miami, Florida. Cuba jams both the medium-wave and shortwave signals, but the shortwave program is heard throughout the Americas.

Two hours of Radio Martí's news programs are carried each night, 10:00 PM to midnight local time, by Miami's WSUA (Caracol 1260 AM). It is also available at various times to subscribers of SiriusXM Satellite Radio on its bilingual channel 153, La Politica Talk.

Radio Martí operates with about 100 employees and a budget of $15 million. Its mission, in its own words, is to provide "a contrast to Cuban media and provide its listeners with an uncensored view of current events." Former prisoners in Cuba and Cuban exiles often speak on Radio Martí, and on Saturdays a Spanish-language version of the U.S. president's weekly radio address, as well as the opposition's response, are transmitted.

== Assessments ==
There is much debate about the effectiveness of these broadcasts.

The watchdog group Cuban Americans for Engagement (CAFE) has been critical of the radio and television station for broadcasts critical of warming relations and cooperative efforts with U.S. organizations. A report by the Committee on Foreign Relations in 2010 stated that less than 2 percent of Cubans listen in. U.S. Senator Mark Pryor (D-Arkansas) and U.S. House of Representatives member Betty McCollum introduced the Stop Wasting Taxpayer Money on Cuba Broadcasting Act to shut the stations down. The Alliance for Responsible Cuba Policy has also been critical of the stations.

== TV Martí ==
=== History ===
In 1990, the U.S. Government created TV Martí to broadcast television programming to Cuba. It began broadcasting on March 27, 1990, beaming daily programs in Spanish via a transmitter affixed to an aerostat balloon – nicknamed "Fat Albert" by people in the area – tethered 10,000 feet (3,048 m) above Cudjoe Key, Florida. Weather affected the broadcasts; "Fat Albert" sometimes was hauled down because of high winds, once broke loose and drifted into the Everglades in 1991, and was destroyed by Hurricane Dennis in 2005. After the aerostat's destruction, TV Martí in October 2006 began to use fixed-wing aircraft to transmit its signals, first a military C-130 Hercules which proved too expensive to operate, and then a Gulfstream twin engine airplane flying a figure-eight pattern off Key West, Florida. One of these aircraft has since been retired.

The first TV Martí broadcasts took place in the very early morning hours to avoid interference with Cuban domestic television programming. This combined with Cuban jamming of the signal has led to low viewership of TV Martí in Cuba, where, according to a U.S. official who was stationed in Havana in the station's early days, it is known as La TV que no se ve ("The TV that can't be seen"). U.S. Government telephone surveys in 1990, 2003, 2006, and 2008 reported Cuban viewership of TV Martí of less than one percent; the U.S. Government ceased the surveys after 2008, claiming that obtaining accurate Cuban domestic television viewership statistics was too difficult.

Despite the frequent reports of its low viewership in Cuba, TV Martí's defenders cited continuing Cuban government jamming of its signal as evidence of its importance, and U.S. Government funding of it continued, with TV Martí broadcasting daily programs in Spanish. In 2012, the administration of President Barack Obama asked the United States Congress to cease funding of the program, but Congress however continued to provide money for it.

=== TV Martí today ===
Like Radio Martí, TV Martí is an element of the International Broadcasting Bureau. TV Marti airs half-hour early and late evening newscasts which a low-power Miami television channel, WGEN-LD, Virtual digital Channel 8.1 (RF digital Channel 8.1), carries along with other programming. The pay-TV platform DirecTV, which is pirated by many people in Cuba, also carries TV Martí.

In May 2013, the U.S. Congress eliminated funding for the operation of Aero Martí, the lone aircraft still committed to TV Martí broadcasts. However, funding for the preservation and maintenance of the plane continues, and it remains in storage in a hangar in Cartersville, Georgia, ready to return to service if funding of its operations resumes.

== Controversy and legality ==
Fabio Leite, deputy director of the Radiocommunications Office of the International Telecommunication Union (ITU), has condemned radio and television transmissions to Cuba from the United States as illegal and inadmissible and more so when they are designed to foment internal subversion on the island. The director emphasized that this constant U.S. attack is in violation of ITU regulations, which stipulate that radio transmissions within commercial broadcasting on medium wave, FM, or television must be conceived of as a good quality national service within the limits of the country concerned.

The Radio Martí broadcasts are directed at Cuba, but can be picked up throughout North, Central, and South America when Cuba is not jamming them. However, Radio Martí programs cannot be specifically directed at U.S. citizens under the same U.S. anti-propaganda law that restricts Voice of America broadcasts.

On November 15, 2007, delegates to the World Radiocommunication Conference 2007 declared illegal the U.S. government's use of airplanes to beam the signals of Washington-funded Radio y Televisión Martí into Cuba, stating "A radio broadcasting station that functions on board an aircraft and transmits only to the territory of another administration without its agreement cannot be considered in conformity with the radio communications regulations."

A report by the U.S. Government Accountability Office accuses the station of engaging in political propaganda in the forms of editorializing, use of offensive and incendiary language in broadcasts, use of unsubstantiated reports coming from Cuba, and presentation of individual views as news. The claims of unprofessionalism are strongly rejected by the station's management. National Public Radio's On the Media program has pointed out that while "the U.S. has spent close to a half billion dollars on TV and Radio Martí, the Cuban government has managed to effectively block the transmission signal, at least on the TV side. Viewership on the island is estimated to be a third of one percent. One study several years ago found that nine out of ten Cubans had never even heard of the channel."

Democracy Now! went on to state that a senior TV Martí executive was indicted by federal prosecutors for providing kickbacks in trade for certain contracts and the inspector general's office has launched a review into the operations of the Office of Cuba Broadcasting which oversees Martí. In addition, the program indicates that Massachusetts Congressman William Delahunt has also promised to hold hearings on TV Martí.

Other critics consider the actual ineffectiveness at reaching a Cuban audience, the risk of the broadcaster's purposes for heavy budget-cuts and the fear of limited editorial independence in order to be manipulated by right-wing Cuban exiles and their political agenda for personal political gain.

In May 2018, Martí broadcast video segments attacking George Soros as a "multimillionaire Jew of Hungarian origin" threatening Latin American democracy. The videos were based on assertions by Judicial Watch. In October 2018 the employees responsible for producing the videos were placed on administrative leave pending an investigation into their conduct.

== See also ==
- Radio Free Dixie (a Cuban-based program directed at the United States)
- WRMI (Radio Miami International), a commercial shortwave radio station targeting Cuba
