= Voice of America =

International US-owned broadcaster

- Abbreviation: VOA or VoA
- Founded: February 1, 1942; 84 years ago
- Type: State-funded international broadcaster
- Headquarters: Wilbur J. Cohen Federal Building
- Location: Washington, D.C., United States
- Director: Michael Abramowitz
- Budget: US$267.5 million (Fiscal year 2023)
- Staff: ~200 (2025)
- Website: www.voanews.com (Old) editorials.voa.gov (Current)

Voice of America (VOA or VoA) is an international broadcaster, funded by the United States federal government and established in 1942. It is the largest and oldest of the US's existing international broadcasters, producing digital, TV, and radio content in 48 languages for affiliate stations around the world. Its targeted and primary audience is non-Americans outside the American borders, especially those living in countries without press freedom or independent journalism. Since 2025, State Media Monitor has classified the United States Agency for Global Media (USAGM) and its outlets, including VOA, Radio Free Asia, and Radio Free Europe/Radio Liberty, as state-controlled media, describing the agency as operating "under direct White House political direction".

VOA was established in 1942, during World War II. Building on American use of shortwave radio during the war, it initially served as an anti-propaganda tool against Axis misinformation but later expanded to include other forms of content, such as American music programs for cultural diplomacy. During the Cold War, its operations expanded to fight communism and contributed to its decline in several countries. Throughout its operations, it has aimed to broadcast uncensored information to residents under restrictive regimes, even airing behind the Iron Curtain. In response, some countries began investing in technology to jam VOA broadcasts. In 2017, Russia designated VOA a foreign agent, requiring it to establish a Russian legal entity. It was blocked in Russia, along with some other Western international broadcasters, in 2022. Its programming can be accessed by Russian listeners using VPNs and other software. Its journalists often take substantial risks reporting inside repressive regimes.

It is headquartered in Washington, D.C., and overseen by the USAGM, an independent agency of the U.S. government funded with Congressional approval, which also oversees Radio Free Asia and Radio Free Europe/Radio Liberty. Funds are appropriated annually under the budget for embassies and consulates. As of 2022, VOA had a weekly worldwide audience of approximately 326 million (up from 237 million in 2016) and employed 961 staff with an annual budget of $267.5 million.

The VOA served its propaganda function by pursuing objective journalism, demonstrating that the US has free press and free speech and providing a contrast for people living in countries where the state exerts tight control over the media. Policies have been implemented to try to preserve its accuracy and independence, including the 1976 VOA charter, which mandates its reporting be "accurate, objective, and comprehensive", and the 1994 US International Broadcasting Act, which prohibits editorial interference by government officials. The agency refers to these laws as its "firewall".

During the first presidency of Donald Trump, leadership at the agency was replaced with Trump allies, and there were several allegations, both internal and external, of interference in hiring and coverage to be loyal to Trump. In his second administration, Trump signed an executive order cutting funding to the USAGM. On March 14, 2025, almost all of VOA's 1,300 journalists, producers, and assistants were placed on administrative leave. The next day, many VOA foreign-language broadcasts replaced news and other regularly scheduled programming with music and the VOA website ceased being updated. On May 6, 2025, Trump ally Kari Lake, the acting head of the agency overseeing VOA, announced that One America News (OAN), a far-right, pro-Trump network known for promoting conspiracy theories, would provide news coverage for VOA.

On June 20, 2025, layoff notices were sent to 639 VOA employees, completing an 85% reduction in staff at the USAGM since the beginning of Trump's second term, and effectively shutting down the service. Of the entire USAGM, 250 employees remained on staff, close to the statutory minimum, with approximately 200 of those at VOA.

On March 17, 2026, United States district court judge Royce Lamberth ordered more than 1,000 VOA employees to return to work by March 23. This ruling followed Lamberth's March 7, 2026, invalidation of Trump's appointment of Kari Lake to lead VOA's parent agency, which nullified the mass layoffs and other actions she took in 2025.

== History ==
=== American private shortwave broadcasting before World War II ===
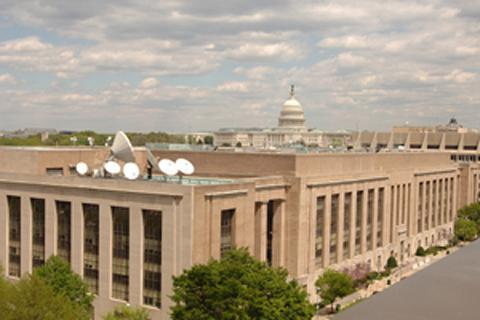
Voice of America headquarters

Before World War II, all American shortwave radio stations were in private hands. Privately controlled shortwave networks included the National Broadcasting Company's International Network (or White Network), which broadcast in six languages, the Columbia Broadcasting System's Latin American international network La Cadena de las Américas, which consisted of 64 stations located in 18 countries, the Crosley Broadcasting Corporation in Cincinnati, Ohio, and General Electric which owned and operated WGEO and WGEA, both based in Schenectady, New York, and KGEI in San Francisco, all of which had shortwave transmitters. Experimental programming began in the 1930s, but there were fewer than 12 transmitters in operation.

In 1939, the U.S. Federal Communications Commission set the following policy, which was intended to enforce the US State Department's Good Neighbor Policy, but which some broadcasters felt was an attempt to direct censorship:

A licensee of an international broadcast station shall render only an international broadcast service which will reflect the culture of this country and which will promote international goodwill, understanding and cooperation. Any program solely intended for, and directed to an audience in the continental United States does not meet the requirements for this service.

Around 1940, shortwave signals to Latin America were regarded as vital to counter Nazi propaganda. Initially, the US Office of the Coordinator of Information sent releases to each station, but this was seen as an inefficient means of transmitting news. The director of Latin American relations at the Columbia Broadcasting System was Edmund A. Chester, and he supervised the development of CBS's extensive La Cadena de las Américas radio network to improve broadcasting to South America during the 1940s.

=== World War II ===
External images
- "La Cadena de las Américas" – Edmund Chester CBS Radio Director in 1943; Here on Getty Images
- The"Viva America" program on CBS Radio including vocalist Nestor Mesta Chayres in 1946; Here on Getty images
- "Viva America" – CBS Radio and Alfredo Antonini, Conductor in 1946; Here on Getty Images

Even before the December 1941 Japanese attack on Pearl Harbor, the U.S. government's Office of the Coordinator of Information (COI) had already begun providing war news and commentary to the commercial American shortwave radio stations for use on a voluntary basis, through its Foreign Information Service (FIS) headed by playwright Robert E. Sherwood, who served as President Franklin Delano Roosevelt's speech writer and information advisor. Direct programming began a week after the United States' entry into World War II in December 1941, with the first broadcast from the San Francisco office of the FIS via General Electric's KGEI transmitting to the Philippines in English (other languages followed). The next step was to broadcast to Germany, which was called Stimmen aus Amerika ("Voices from America") and was transmitted on February 1, 1942. It was introduced by the “Battle Hymn of the Republic" and included the pledge: "Today, and every day from now on, we will be with you from America to talk about the war... The news may be good or bad for us – We will always tell you the truth." Roosevelt approved this broadcast, which then-Colonel William J. Donovan (COI) and Sherwood (FIS) had recommended to him. It was Sherwood who actually coined the term "The Voice of America" to describe the shortwave network that began its transmissions on February 1, from 270 Madison Avenue in New York City.

The Office of War Information, when organized in the middle of 1942, officially took over VOA's operations. VOA reached an agreement with the British Broadcasting Corporation to share medium-wave transmitters in Great Britain, and expanded into Tunis in North Africa and Palermo and Bari, Italy, as the Allies captured these territories. The OWI also set up the American Broadcasting Station in Europe. Asian transmissions started with one transmitter in California in 1941; services were expanded by adding transmitters in Hawaii and, after recapture, the Philippines.

By the end of the war, VOA had 39 transmitters and provided service in 40 languages. Programming was broadcast from production centers in New York and San Francisco, with more than 1,000 programs originating from New York. Programming consisted of music, news, commentary, and relays of U.S. domestic programming, in addition to specialized VOA programming. About half of VOA's services, including the Arabic service, were discontinued in 1945. In late 1945, VOA was transferred to the US Department of State.

Also included among the cultural diplomacy programming on the Columbia Broadcasting System was the musical show Viva America (1942–49) which featured the Pan American Orchestra and the artistry of several noted musicians from both North and South America, including Alfredo Antonini, Juan Arvizu, Eva Garza, Elsa Miranda, Nestor Mesta Chaires, Miguel Sandoval, John Serry Sr., and Terig Tucci. By 1945, broadcasts of the show were carried by 114 stations on CBS's La Cadena de las Américas network in 20 Latin American nations. These broadcasts proved to be highly successful in supporting President Roosevelt's policy of Pan-Americanism throughout South America during World War II.

=== Cold War ===
The Iron Curtain, in black: NATO members (Note: Spain joined NATO in 1982.) Warsaw Pact countries

The VOA ramped up its operations during the Cold War. Foy Kohler, the director of VOA from 1949 to 1952, strongly believed that the VOA was serving its purpose, which he identified as aiding in the fight against communism. He argued that the numbers of listeners they were getting such as 194,000 regular listeners in Sweden, and 2.1 million regular listeners in France, was an indication of a positive impact. As further evidence, he noted that the VOA received 30,000 letters a month from listeners all over the world, and hundreds of thousands of requests for broadcasting schedules. There was an analysis done of some of those letters sent in 1952 and 1953 while Kohler was still director. The study found that letter writing could be an indicator of successful, actionable persuasion. It was also found that broadcasts in different countries were having different effects. In one country, regular listeners adopted and practiced American values presented by the broadcast. Age was also a factor: younger and older audiences tended to like different types of programs, no matter the country. Kohler used all of this as evidence to claim that the VOA helped to grow and strengthen the free world. It also influenced the UN in their decision to condemn communist actions in Korea, and was a major factor in the decline of communism in the "free world, including key countries such as Italy and France. In Italy, the VOA contributed to the decline of communism and a process of "Westernization". The VOA also had an impact behind the Iron Curtain. Practically all defectors during Kohler's time said that the VOA helped in their decision to defect. Another indication of impact, according to Kohler, was the Soviet response. Kohler argued that the Soviets responded because the VOA was having an impact. Based on Soviet responses, it can be presumed that the most effective programs were ones that compared the lives of those behind and outside the Iron Curtain, questions on the practice of slave labor, as well as lies and errors in Stalin's version of Marxism.

In 1947, VOA started broadcasting to the Soviet citizens in Russia under the pretext of countering "more harmful instances of Soviet propaganda directed against American leaders and policies" on the part of the internal Soviet Russian-language media, according to John B. Whitton's treatise, Cold War Propaganda. The Soviet Union responded by initiating electronic jamming of VOA broadcasts on April 24, 1949.

Charles W. Thayer headed VOA in 1948–49. Over the next few years, the U.S. government debated the best role of Voice of America. The decision was made to use VOA broadcasts as part of U.S. foreign policy to counter the propaganda of the Soviet Union and other countries. The Arabic service resumed on January 1, 1950, with a half-hour program. This program grew to 14.5 hours daily during the Suez Crisis of 1956, and was six hours a day by 1958. Between 1952 and 1960, Voice of America used a converted U.S. Coast Guard cutter, Courier, as its first mobile broadcasting ship.

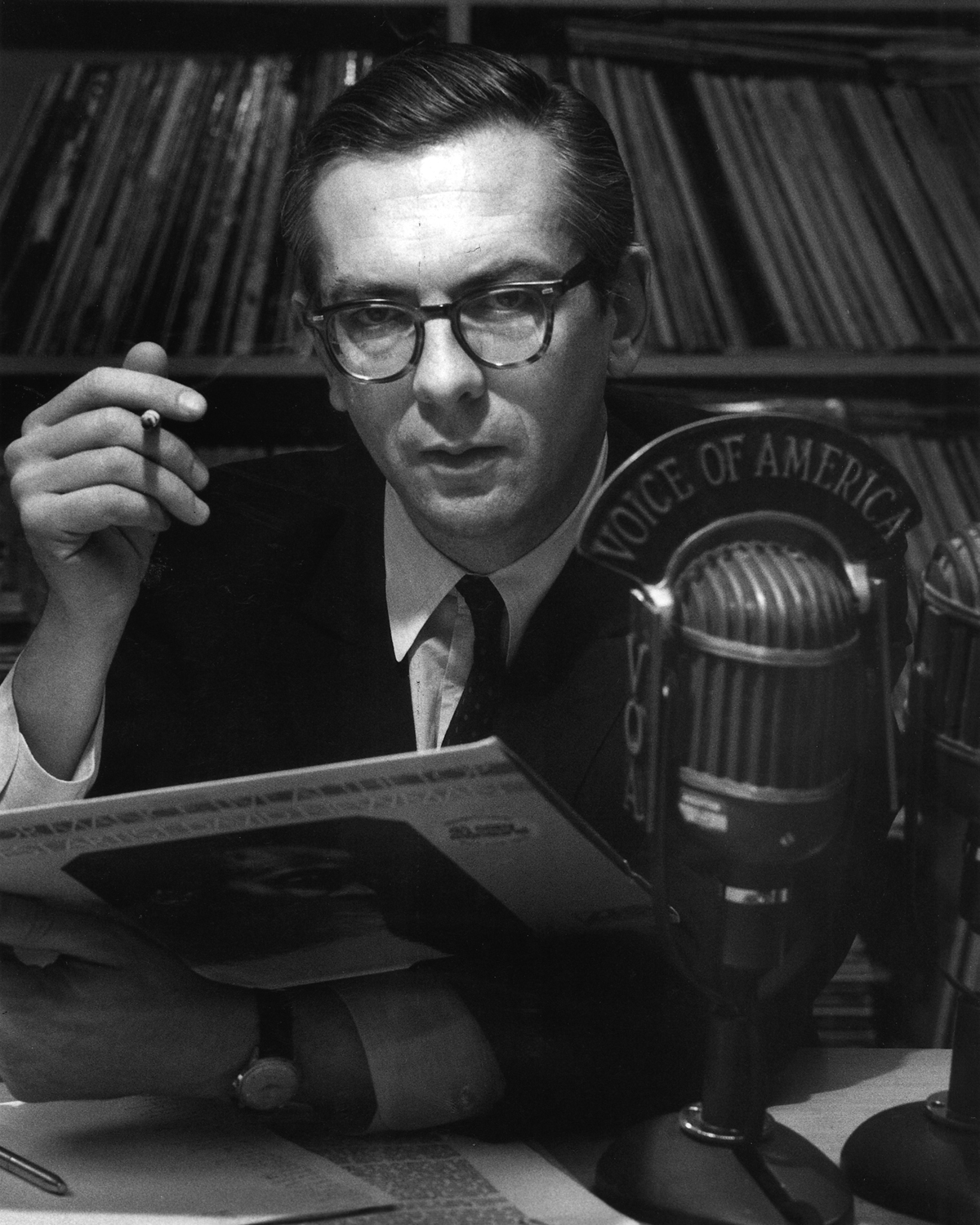
Willis Conover broadcasting with Voice of America in 1969

Control of VOA passed from the State Department to the U.S. Information Agency when the latter was established in 1953 to transmit worldwide, including to the countries behind the Iron Curtain and to the People's Republic of China. From 1955 until 2003, VOA broadcast American jazz on the Voice of America Jazz Hour. Hosted for most of that period by Willis Conover, the program had 30 million listeners at its peak. A program aimed at South Africa in 1956 broadcast two hours nightly, and special programs such as The Newport Jazz Festival were also transmitted. This was done in association with tours by U.S. musicians, such as Dizzy Gillespie, Louis Armstrong, and Duke Ellington, sponsored by the State Department. From August 1952 through May 1953, Billy Brown, a high school senior in Westchester County, New York, had a Monday night program in which he shared everyday happenings in Yorktown Heights, New York. Brown's program ended due to its popularity: his "chatty narratives" attracted so much fan mail, VOA couldn't afford the $500 a month in clerical and postage costs required to respond to listeners' letters. In 1953, VOA personnel were subjected to McCarthyist policies, where VOA was accused by Senator Joseph McCarthy, Roy Cohn, and Gerard David Schine of intentionally planning to build weak transmitting stations to sabotage VOA broadcasts. The charges were dropped after one month of court hearings in February and March 1953.

Sometime around 1954, VOA's headquarters were moved from New York to Washington, D.C. The arrival of cheap, low-cost transistors enabled the significant growth of shortwave radio listeners. During the Hungarian Revolution of 1956, VOA's broadcasts were deemed controversial, as Hungarian refugees and revolutionaries thought that VOA served as a medium and insinuated the possible arrival of Western aid.

Throughout the Cold War, many of the targeted countries' governments sponsored jamming of VOA broadcasts, which sometimes led critics to question the broadcasts' actual impact. For example, in 1956, the Polish People's Republic stopped jamming VOA transmissions, but the People's Republic of Bulgaria continued to jam the signal through the 1970s. Edward R. Murrow said that: "The Russians spend more money jamming the Voice of America than we have to spend for the entire program of the entire Agency. They spend about $125 million [$1.2 billion in 2025] a year jamming it." Chinese-language VOA broadcasts were jammed beginning in 1956 and extending through 1976. Following the collapse of the Warsaw Pact and the Soviet Union, interviews with participants in anti-Soviet movements verified the effectiveness of VOA broadcasts in transmitting information to socialist societies. The People's Republic of China diligently jams VOA broadcasts. Cuba has also been reported to interfere with VOA satellite transmissions to Iran from its Russian-built transmission site at Bejucal. David Jackson, former director of Voice of America, noted: "The North Korean government doesn't jam us, but they try to keep people from listening through intimidation or worse. But people figure out ways to listen despite the odds. They're very resourceful."

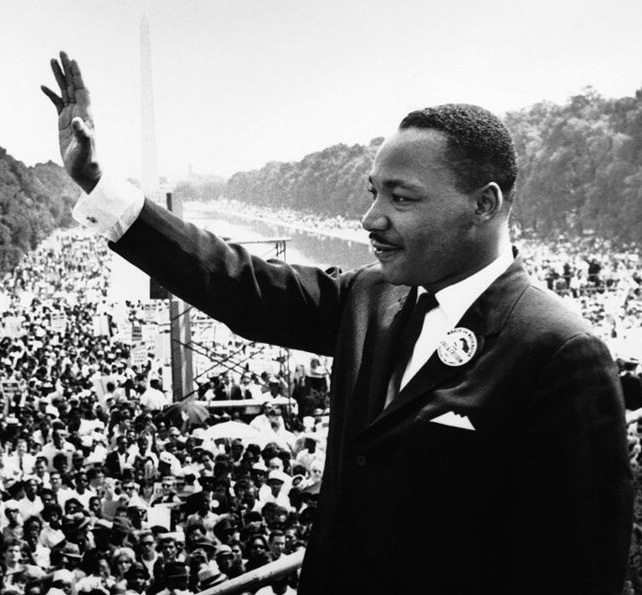
Martin Luther King Jr. addresses a crowd from the steps of the Lincoln Memorial, where he delivered his "I Have a Dream" speech.

VOA News (November 22, 1963)
Live radio broadcast announcing JFK's death

Throughout the 1960s and 1970s, VOA covered some of the era's most important news, including Martin Luther King Jr.'s 1963 "I Have a Dream" speech, the Assassination of John F. Kennedy, and Neil Armstrong's 1969 first walk on the Moon, which drew an audience estimated at between 615 and 750 million people. In 1973, due to the détente policies in the Cold War, Soviet jamming of the VOA ceased; it restarted in 1979.

Buzz Aldrin on the moon, in a photograph taken by Neil Armstrong, who can be seen in the visor reflection along with Earth

In the early 1980s, VOA began a $1.3 billion rebuilding program to improve broadcasting with better technical capabilities. During the implementation of Martial law in Poland between 1981 and 1983, VOA's Polish broadcasts expanded to seven hours daily. Throughout the 1980s, VOA focused on covering events from the "American hinterland", such as 150th anniversary of the Oregon Trail. Also in the 1980s, VOA also added a television service, as well as special regional programs to Cuba, Radio Martí and TV Martí. Cuba has consistently attempted to jam such broadcasts and has vociferously protested U.S. broadcasts directed at Cuba. In September 1980, VOA started broadcasting to Afghanistan in Dari and in Pashto in 1982. In 1981, VOA opened a bureau in Beijing, China. The next year, it began regular exchanges with Radio Peking.

In 1985, VOA Europe was established as a special service in English that was relayed via satellite to AM, FM, and cable affiliates throughout Europe. With a contemporary format including live disc jockeys, the network presented top musical hits as well as VOA news and features of local interest (such as "EuroFax") 24 hours a day. VOA Europe was closed down without advance public notice in January 1997 as a cost-cutting measure. It was followed by VOA Express, which from July 4, 1999, was revamped into VOA Music Mix. Since November 1, 2014, stations have been offering VOA1 (which is a rebranding of VOA Music Mix).

In 1989, Voice of America expanded its Mandarin and Cantonese programming to reach millions of Chinese and inform the country about the pro-democracy movement within the country, including the demonstration in Tiananmen Square. Starting in 1990, the U.S. consolidated its international broadcasting efforts with the establishment of the Bureau of Broadcasting.

=== Post–Cold War ===
With the breakup of the Soviet bloc in Eastern Europe, VOA added many additional language services to reach those areas. This decade was marked by the additions of services in Standard Tibetan, Kurdish (to Iran and Iraq), Serbo-Croatian (Croatian, Serbian, Bosnian), Macedonian, and Rwanda-Rundi. During this period, Voice of America's coverage of Central and Eastern Europe included reporting by Jolyon Naegele, who served as the region's correspondent from 1984 to 1994.

In 1993, the Clinton administration advised cutting funding for Radio Free Europe/Radio Liberty, as it believed post-Cold War information and influence were not needed in Europe. This plan was not well received, and US president Bill Clinton then proposed the compromise of the International Broadcasting Act, which he signed into law in 1994. This law established the International Broadcasting Bureau as a part of the United States Information Agency (USIA), and established the Broadcasting Board of Governors (BBG) with oversight authority, which took control from the Board for International Broadcasters, which previously had overseen funding for RFE/RL. In 1998, the Foreign Affairs Reform and Restructuring Act was signed into law, and mandated that the BBG become an independent federal agency as of October 1, 1999. This act also abolished the USIA and merged most of its functions into those of the State Department.

The Arabic Service was abolished in 2002 and replaced by a new radio service, called the Middle East Radio Network or Radio Sawa, with an initial budget of $22 million. Radio Sawa offered mostly Western and Middle Eastern popular songs with periodic brief news bulletins. It then expanded to television with Alhurra in February 2004 (and later to various social media and websites). In May 2004, the US government's international English-language TV service Worldnet became part of VOA as "VOA TV".

As part of an effort to allocate resources to broadcasts in the Islamic world, radio programs in Russian, Hindi, Ukrainian, Serbian, Macedonian, and Bosnian ended in 2008. In September 2010, VOA began radio broadcasts in Sudan. As U.S. interests in South Sudan grew, there was a desire to provide people with free information. In 2013, budget cuts led VOA to end foreign-language transmissions on shortwave and medium wave to Albania, Georgia, Iran, and Latin America, as well as English-language broadcasts to the Middle East and Afghanistan. Then, in 2014, most of its English-language transmissions to Asia were cut, as well as shortwave transmissions in Azerbaijani, Bengali, Khmer, Kurdish, Lao, Uzbek, and Greek.

=== Internet era ===
In 1994, Voice of America became the first broadcast news organization to offer continuously updated programs on the Internet.

From 1948 until its amendment in 2013, Voice of America was forbidden to broadcast directly to American citizens, pursuant to § 501 of the Smith–Mundt Act. The intent of the 1948 legislation was to protect the American public from propaganda by its own government and to avoid any competition with private American companies. The act was amended via the passage of the Smith-Mundt Modernization Act provision of the National Defense Authorization Act for 2013. The amendment was intended to adapt the law to the Internet and to allow American citizens access to VOA content. The online presence of the VOA brought with it the VOA Pronunciation Guide, which became a popular reference resource for pronouncing foreign non-English names in the news.

VOA Radiogram was an experimental Voice of America program that began in March 2013 and ended in June 2017, which transmitted digital text and images via shortwave radiograms. There were 220 editions of the program, transmitted each weekend from the Edward R. Murrow transmitting station. The audio tones that comprised the bulk of each 30-minute program were transmitted via an analog transmitter and could be decoded using a basic AM shortwave receiver with freely downloadable software of the Fldigi family. This software was available for Windows, macOS, Linux, and FreeBSD systems. Broadcasts could also be decoded using the free TIVAR app from the Google Play Store using any Android device. The mode used most often on VOA Radiogram, for both text and images, was MFSK32, but other modes were also occasionally transmitted. The final edition of VOA Radiogram was transmitted during the weekend of June 17–18, 2017, a week before the retirement of the program producer from VOA. An offer to continue the broadcasts on a contract basis was declined, so a follow-on show called Shortwave Radiogram began transmission on June 25, 2017, from the WRMI transmitting site in Okeechobee, Florida.

In 2021, Voice of America launched 52 Documentary, a series that publishes weekly films about human experiences. The series is presented on the streaming app, VOA+, and YouTube. Films average 10–15 minutes and are translated with captions in several languages, including Russian, Persian, Mandarin, Urdu, and English. Euna Lee directs the program.

=== Changes during the first Trump administration ===
Following the January 2017 inauguration of U.S. president Donald Trump, tweets by Voice of America appeared to support debunked claims by White House press secretary Sean Spicer about the crowd size and related media coverage. This raised concerns over possible attempts by Trump to politicize VOA. An Obama-era law gave the powers of the board of the Broadcasting Board of Governors to a CEO appointed by the president, and Trump's selection of aides to work with the CEO – a former writer for the right-wing website The Daily Surge and a field director from Americans for Prosperity – during the presidential transition, raised concerns about VOA being transformed into a more traditional state propaganda platform. VOA officials responded with assurances that they would not become "Trump TV", citing existing laws that prevent interference in editorial processes.

During the COVID-19 pandemic, claims and messaging from the Trump administration diverged from that of public health experts and journalists. In April 2020, the White House published an article in its daily newsletter critical of VOA coverage of the coronavirus pandemic. Centers for Disease Control and Prevention (CDC) press official Michawn Rich sent a memo to agency employees telling them to deny interview requests by VOA. When VOA reported that Vice President Mike Pence's office required the press to wear masks to cover his visit to the Mayo Clinic, his office then threatened retaliation against the reporter, according to the Washington Post.

On June 3, 2020, the U.S. Senate confirmed Michael Pack, a conservative documentarian and close ally of Steve Bannon, to serve as head of the US Agency for Global Media, which oversees VOA. Subsequently, Director Bennet and Deputy Director Sandy Sugawara resigned from VOA. On June 17, the heads of VOA's Middle East Broadcasting, Radio Free Asia, Radio Free Europe/Radio Liberty, and the Open Technology Fund were all fired, their boards were dissolved, and external communications from VOA employees required approval from senior agency personnel in what one source described as an "unprecedented" move. Four former members of the advisory boards filed suit challenging Pack's standing to fire them. On July 9, NPR reported VOA would not renew the work visas of dozens of non-resident reporters, many of whom could face repercussions in their home countries. In late July, four contractors and the head of VOA's Urdu-language service were suspended after a video featuring extensive clips from a Muslim-American voter conference, including a campaign message from then-Democratic presidential candidate Joe Biden, was determined not to meet editorial standards and taken down. The Post reported that VOA Spanish-language service White House correspondent's Brigo Segovia's interview with an official about the administration's response to Pack's personnel and other moves had been censored and his own access to VOA's computer system restricted.

In response to Pack's August 27 interview with The Federalist website, a group of VOA journalists sent a letter to VOA Acting Director Elez Biberaj complaining that Pack's "comments and decisions 'endanger the personal security of VOA reporters at home and abroad, as well as threatening to harm U.S. national security objectives.'" VOA's response indicated the journalists may be punished for sending the letter.

On September 29, six senior USAGM officials filed a whistleblower complaint in which they alleged that Pack or one of his aides had ordered research conducted into the voting history of at least one agency employee, which would be a violation of laws protecting civil servants from undue political influence. NPR reported that two Pack aides had compiled a report on VOA White House bureau chief Steven L. Herman's social media postings and other writings in an attempt to charge him with a conflict of interest, and that the agency released a conflict of interest policy stating in part that a "journalist who on Facebook 'likes' a comment or political cartoon that aggressively attacks or disparages the President must recuse themselves from covering the President." A preliminary injunction issued on November 20 barred Pack "from making personnel decisions involving journalists at the networks; from directly communicating with editors and journalists employed by them; and from investigating any editors or news stories produced by them," and characterized the investigation of Herman as an "unconstitutional prior restraint" of his, his editors', and fellow journalists' free speech.

Suspended officials from Voice of America sued the agency's news outlet on October 8. They accused Pack of using Voice of America as a vehicle to promote the personal agenda of President Trump and of violating a statutory firewall intended to prevent political interference with the agency, and they sought their reinstatement. In November 2020, US District Court Judge Beryl Howell found Pack violated the First Amendment rights of Voice of America journalists.

In December 2020, The Washington Post reported that Pack was refusing to cooperate with Joe Biden's President-elect transition team and, in an end run around the court order, had persuaded VOA Acting Director Biberaj to step down, replacing him with Robert Reilly, a former VOA director who had written critically of Muslims, gays, and lesbians. On December 19, 33 days before President-elect Biden's inauguration, Pack named Ted Lipien, a former VOA veteran journalist who had since become an outspoken critic of the platform, as head of RFE/RL, and Breitbart writer Jeffrey Scott Shapiro as head of the Office of Cuba Broadcasting. Pack attempted to add contractual language that would make it impossible to fire the broadcasting board members he had installed for two years, but it was withdrawn after inquiries from the media and Congress.

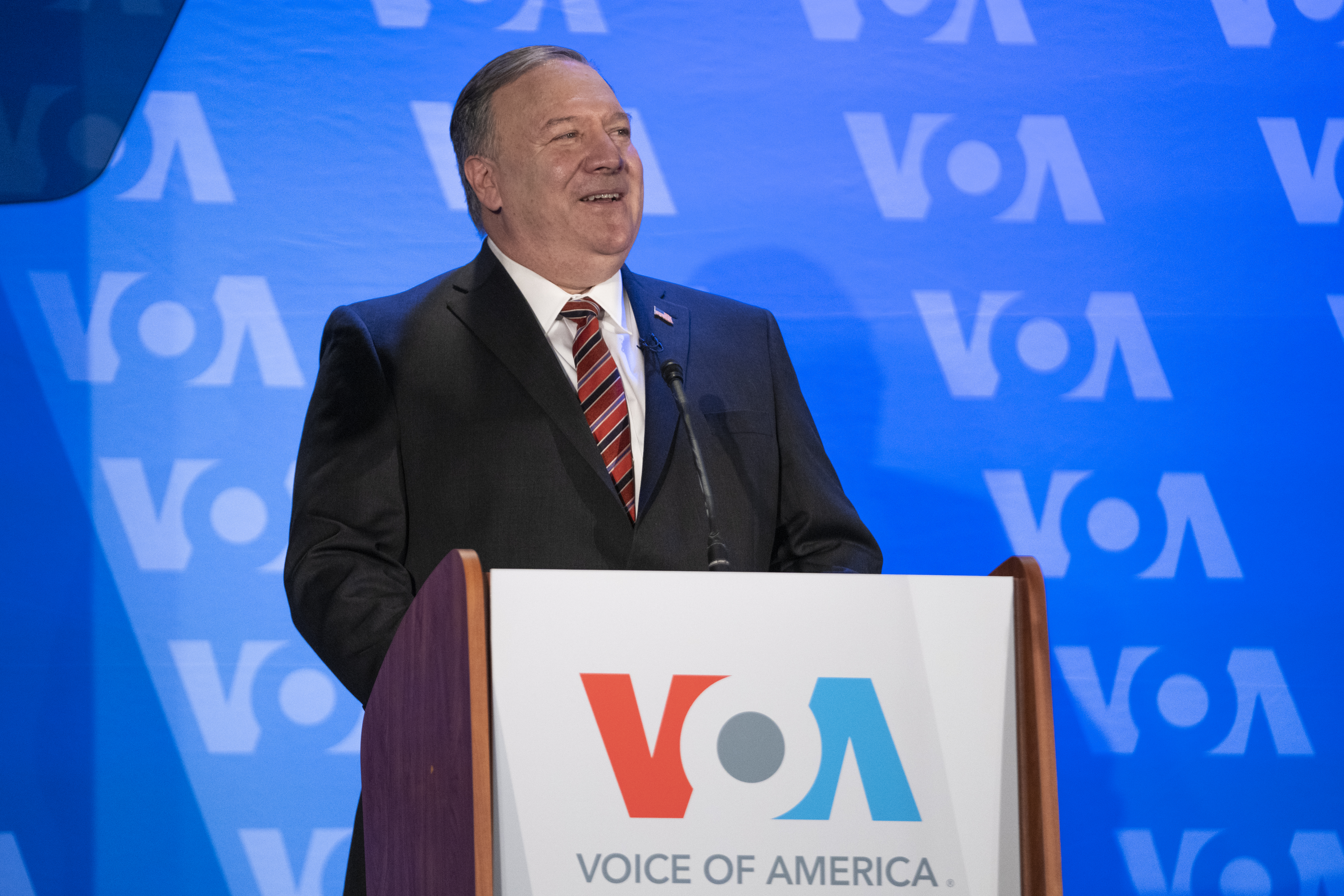
Then-Secretary of State Mike Pompeo speaks at VOA headquarters in January 2021.

On January 11, 2021, VOA interim director Reilly ordered veteran reporter Patsy Widakuswara off the White House beat. Secretary of State Mike Pompeo gave a speech critical of VOA and conducted an interview with VOA Director Robert Reilly about the dangers of censorship, then did not take permit press questions to Widakuswara, followed Pompeo out, trying to ask questions. In response, dozens of VOA journalists, including Widakuswara, wrote and circulated a petition calling on Reilly and public affairs specialist Elizabeth Robbins to resign. In a statement, U.S. House Foreign Affairs Committee Chairman Gregory Meeks and ranking member Michael McCaul supported her reinstatement.

As of 2024, the audience was larger than the next-largest international broadcaster, the BBC World Service.

On January 19, the last full day of the Trump presidency, Pack named a slate of five directors to head each of the three USAGM boards for RFE/RL, Radio Free Asia, and Middle East Broadcasting Networks: conservative radio talk show host Blanquita Cullum, Liberty Counsel officer Johnathan Alexander, former White House staffer Amanda Milius, conservative writer Roger Simon, and Center for the National Interest Fellow Christian Whiton. The following day, Pack resigned at the request of the Biden administration. On January 21, Shapiro resigned from the Office of Cuba Broadcasting. Biden named veteran VOA journalist Kelu Chao to replace Pack. Chao, in turn, dismissed Riley and Robbins from VOA, naming Yolanda Lopez, another VOA veteran, as acting director; Lopez had also been reassigned in the wake of the Pompeo interview. On January 22, the Biden administration fired Victoria Coates and her deputy, Robert Greenway, from the Middle East Broadcasting Networks, naming Kelley Sullivan as acting head.

=== Changes during the second Trump administration ===
In December 2024, Donald Trump, as president-elect, announced Kari Lake would be his choice for VOA Director. Lake had called for imprisoning journalists whose reporting she called "lies", called for imprisoning a political opponent, and left her previous job as a newscaster for the Phoenix, Arizona television station KSAZ. Though the president may make a nomination, under the International Broadcasting Act, only the International Broadcasting Advisory Board has the authority to approve the appointment or removal of the VOA Director.

In February 2025, Elon Musk, the functional leader of DOGE, called for VoA and Radio Free Europe to shut down, coming after previously made suggestions by other government officials to shutter the agency. In February and March 2025, it was reported that a chief national correspondent of VOA was placed on paid leave, and veteran reporter Patsy Widakuswara was reassigned from the White House beat. Widakuswara had been given the same reassignment during the first Trump administration, which was reversed under Biden. At the same time, it was also reported that at least two articles containing criticism of Trump were not published or were changed after publication. A Trump administration official, Richard Grenell, called the VOA chief correspondent's comments "treasonous" in a post on X.

VOA Burmese goes dark at 21:00 Myanmar Time on March 15, 2025, as a result of staff reductions and lockouts.

On the night of March 14, Trump signed an executive order, labeling the agency "the Voice of Radical America" and reducing the functions of several agencies, including the U.S. Agency for Global Media, to the minimum required by law. The next day, all employees could not access VOA headquarters, and many VOA foreign language broadcasts replaced news and other regularly scheduled programming with music. More than 1,300 Voice of America employees were placed on leave. VOA has also set about ending contracts with the Associated Press, Reuters, and Agence France-Presse. Kari Lake, the special advisor to the USAGM selected by Trump, estimated that ending these contracts would save $53 million. Michael Abramowitz, the director of VOA, said in a Facebook post on March 15 that he was also placed on leave, along with "virtually the entire staff" of 1,300. The announcement came exactly 24 hours after President Trump signed an executive order to gut VOA's parent agency, as well as the network having a move to terminate contracts with the Associated Press, Reuters, and Agence France-Presse. Some of VOA's local-language radio stations have stopped broadcasting news reports and switched over to music automation to fill the airtime.

Writing for The Atlantic, Toluse Olorunnipa reported:

For the first time since VOA was founded in 1942, to counter Nazi propaganda during World War II, the network went dark in March. In some parts of the world, viewers wondered if the blank screens meant a coup had taken place in the U.S., Steve Herman, who recently retired from VOA after a 20-year career, told me.

The decision to cut the service, which has primarily served to counter propaganda in authoritarian countries, was met with praise from Russian and Chinese state media pundits and condemnation by Reporters Without Borders, who said it sends a "chilling signal" to China and Russia that they "now have free rein to spread their propaganda unchecked." Since the cuts, China Radio International added more than 80 new frequencies, including some that VOA formerly used.

In response, lawsuits were filed against the Trump administration in March 2025. One lawsuit noted that some VOA employees were foreign nationals with J-1 visas and faced risks to their safety if they were forced to return to their home countries if their visas were to be revoked due to loss of employment. In March 2025, the District Court for the Southern District of New York issued a temporary restraining order, preventing the Trump administration from carrying out any further actions resulting from the executive order, including terminating staff, ending contracts, or closing offices. At the defendants' request, this case was transferred to the District of Columbia district court.

On April 22, 2025, a preliminary injunction from the U.S. District Court for the District of Columbia ordered the Trump administration to 1) restore VOA and return its employees and contractors to work, 2) restore VOA's 2025 grants to Radio Free Asia (RFA) and Middle East Broadcasting Networks, and 3) restore VOA as "a consistently reliable and authoritative source of news." On May 3, a three-judge panel of the Court of Appeals for the District of Columbia Circuit stayed the first two parts of the injunction in a 2-1 decision, citing a lack of jurisdiction by the district court, one judge (appointed by Barack Obama) dissenting from the decision of the other two (who were both appointed by Donald Trump). The third part of the district court's injunction remains in effect. On August 25, the district court ordered Lake and two other defendants to sit for depositions before September 15 as "one final opportunity, short of a contempt trial" to show they were complying with the third part of the injunction.

On May 6, 2025, Kari Lake announced that One America News (OAN), a far-right, pro-Trump network known for promoting conspiracy theories, will provide news coverage for VOA. Following the June 2025 Israeli strikes on Iran, several dozen Farsi-speaking VOA staffers were called back to work.

On June 20, 2025, layoff notices were sent to 639 VOA employees, effectively shutting down the service. On June 29, the layoffs were rescinded by Kari Lake due to errors in the notices.

Mass layoffs forced many VOA journalists on J-1 visas to leave the U.S. within 30 days of losing their jobs. In July, referring to former VOA employees, Lake told the right-wing Real America's Voice media channel that "If you overstay your visa, ICE is going to find you."

In late August 2025, the Trump administration announced further reductions, paring the staff to 108 persons. Two areas that are not being eliminated are Farsi-speaking staff and those in its Office of Cuba Broadcasting division.

On August 29, Lake announced on social media that all but about 100 VOA employees would receive layoff notices. From broadcasting in 49 languages daily to 360 million people, as of that date, VOA broadcast in only four languages (Persian, Mandarin, and the Afghan languages Dari and Pashto). In February 2026, RFA announced the resumption of service to China, Tibet, North Korea and Myanmar citing "private contracting with transmission services." Mandarin content was online only while Tibetan, Uyghur, Korean and Burmese content aired over short- and medium-wave radio frequencies.

Subsequently, 532 full-time VOA employees received layoff notices. However, on September 30, the district court ordered the layoff suspended and the defendants to provide information, including a plan to restore VOA as a reliable and authoritative news source by October 14. In its order, the court noted the "concerning disrespect" the defendants had shown toward its earlier orders that it said "would more than support a trial on civil contempt."

In 2026, The New York Times reported that VOA "ran stories that appeared to violate the law that mandates unbiased coverage". It highlighted a January 2026 article published by VOA in Chinese that praised Trump in glowing terms, cited his dubious claim of ending eight wars, featured a photoshopped image of Trump in front of an American flag imposed on a world map, and did not feature opposing views of the president.

Kari Lake's leadership at USAGM, which oversees Voice of America (VOA), faced criticism for alleged resource cuts and restrictions on VOA Persian amid U.S.-Iran tensions. Critics accused Lake of appointing controversial figure Ali Javanmardi, a former activist and VOA journalist described as divisive and accused of personal biases, to lead or oversee the Persian service as senior adviser. In early 2026, VOA Persian staff alleged editorial interference under Javanmardi, including alleged bans on mentioning Reza Pahlavi or related protester chants against the regime, with claims of reprimands or blacklisting for violations.

On March 6, journalist Ahmad Batebi claimed he was fired after confronting Javanmardi over alleged censorship of protester support for regime-change motivations. On March 23, VoA journalists filed suit against Javanmardi and other Trump appointees, claiming they were interfering with VoA editorial decisions in violation of law.

On March 7, U.S. District Court Judge Royce Lamberth ruled that President Trump's appointment of Kari Lake to lead VOA's parent agency was illegal as it violated the federal Vacancies Act, which in turn nullified the mass layoffs and other actions she took during 2025.

On March 17, 2026, Lamberth ordered more than 1,000 VOA employees to return to work by March 23.

== Operations ==
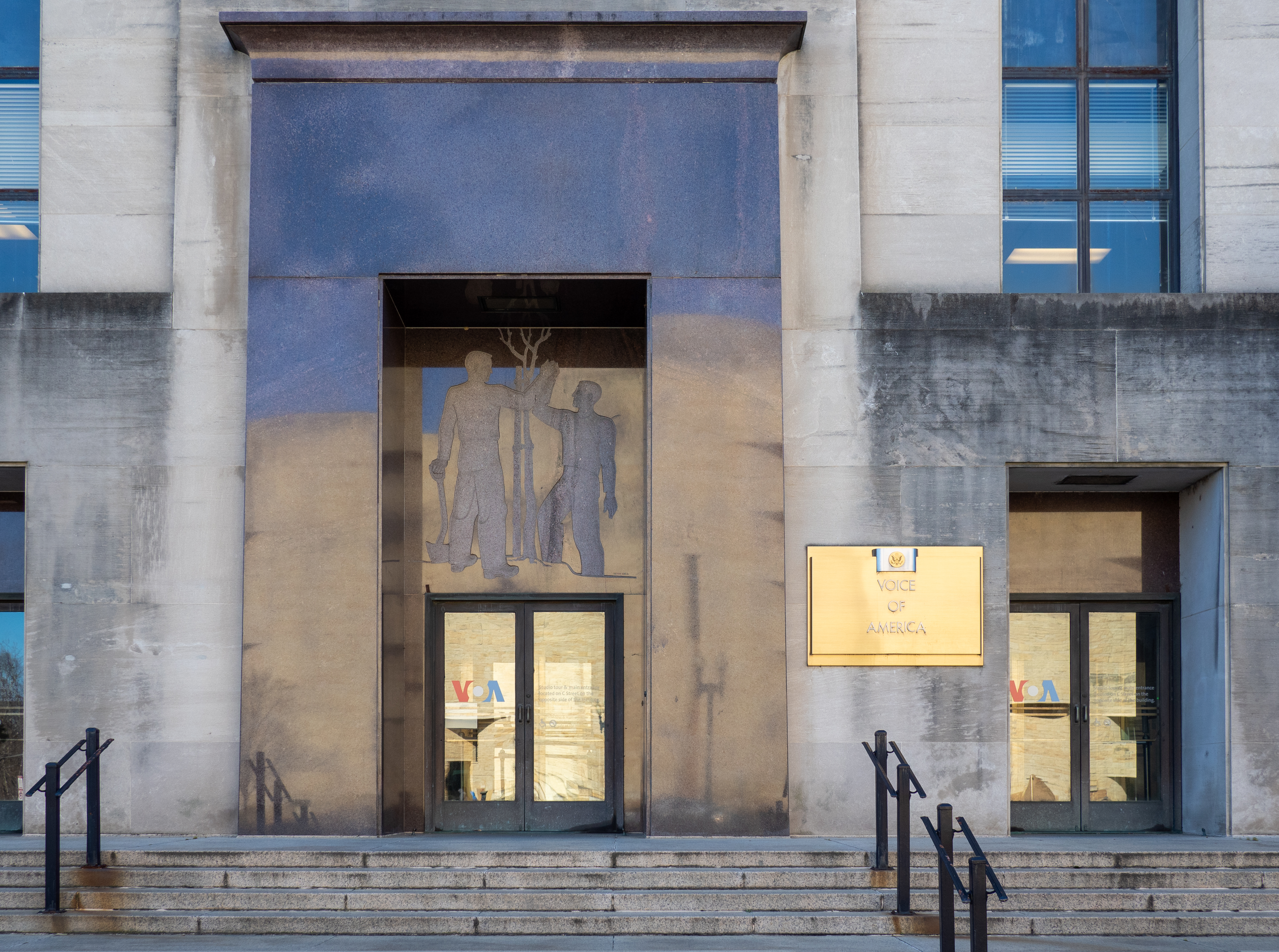
Voice of America building front in Washington, DC

=== List of directors ===
- 1941–1942 Robert E. Sherwood (Foreign Information Service)
1. 1942–1943: John Houseman
2. 1943–1945: Louis G. Cowan
3. 1945–1946: John Ogilvie
4. 1948–1949: Charles W. Thayer
5. 1949–1952: Foy D. Kohler
6. 1952–1953: Alfred H. Morton
7. 1953–1954: Leonard Erikson
8. 1954–1956: John R. Poppele
9. 1956–1958: Robert E. Burton
10. 1958–1965: Henry Loomis
11. 1965–1967: John Chancellor
12. 1967–1968: John Charles Daly
13. 1969–1977: Kenneth R. Giddens
14. 1977–1979: R. Peter Straus
15. 1980–1981: Mary G. F. Bitterman
16. 1981–1982: James B. Conkling
17. 1982: John Hughes
18. 1982–1984: Kenneth Tomlinson
19. 1985: Gene Pell
20. 1986–1991: Dick Carlson
21. 1991–1993: Chase Untermeyer
22. 1994–1996: Geoffrey Cowan
23. 1997–1999: Evelyn S. Lieberman
24. 1999–2001: Sanford J. Ungar
25. 2001–2002: Robert R. Reilly
26. 2002–2006: David S. Jackson
27. 2006–2011: Danforth W. Austin
28. 2011–2015: David Ensor
29. 2016–2020: Amanda Bennett
30. 2020–2021: Robert R. Reilly
31. 2021–2024: vacant
32. 2024–present: Michael Abramowitz

The incumbent director, Michael Abramowitz, assumed the position in July 2024. He previously served as president of Freedom House and spent nearly 25 years as a reporter and editor for The Washington Post.

In December 2024, president-elect Trump announced he would name former news anchor Kari Lake to be the director of VOA. Under the International Broadcasting Act only the International Broadcasting Advisory Board has the authority to approve the appointment or removal of the VOA Director. But in the first week of his second presidency, Trump fired all IBAB members except the Secretary of State Marco Rubio and in March 2025, Trump signed an executive order to shutting down the USAGM and its child agencies.

=== Agencies ===
Voice of America has been a part of several agencies. From its founding in 1942 to 1945, it was part of the Office of War Information, and then from 1945 to 1953 as a function of the State Department. VOA was placed under the U.S. Information Agency in 1953. When the USIA was abolished in 1999, VOA was placed under the BBG which is an autonomous U.S. government agency, with bipartisan membership. The Secretary of State has a seat on the BBG. The BBG was established as a buffer to protect VOA and other U.S.-sponsored, non-military, international broadcasters from political interference. It replaced the Board for International Broadcasting (BIB) that oversaw the funding and operation of Radio Free Europe/Radio Liberty, a branch of VOA.

=== Editorial policies ===
Voice of America's editorial policies are intended to cultivate a reputation for accuracy. It has enacted several policies over time to reduce the ability of politicians to interfere.

Under the Eisenhower administration in 1959, VOA Director Henry Loomis commissioned a formal statement of principles to protect the integrity of VOA programming and define the organization's mission, and was issued by Director George V. Allen as a directive in 1960 and was endorsed in 1962 by USIA director Edward R. Murrow. VOA's charter was signed into law by President Gerald Ford. The charter requires it to "present the policies of the United States clearly and effectively." Academics including Téwodros W. Workneh have described this as a public diplomacy function. VOA's charter also requires it to be "a reliable and authoritative source of news" which "shall be accurate, objective, and comprehensive". According to former VOA correspondent Alan Heil, the internal policy of VOA News is that any story broadcast must have two independently corroborating sources or have a staff correspondent witness an event.

The Voice of America "Firewall" was put into place with the 1976 VOA Charter and laws passed in 1994 and 2016. The firewall's aim is to guard against propaganda while promoting unbiased and objective journalistic standards in the agency.

Despite the firewall, some VOA employees have emphasized how their work serves the goals of the U.S. government. In one instance, a VOA employee told another journalist that "I always keep the best U.S. interests in mind when explaining official policies and why democracy is the best political system to foreign audiences."

=== Transmission facilities ===
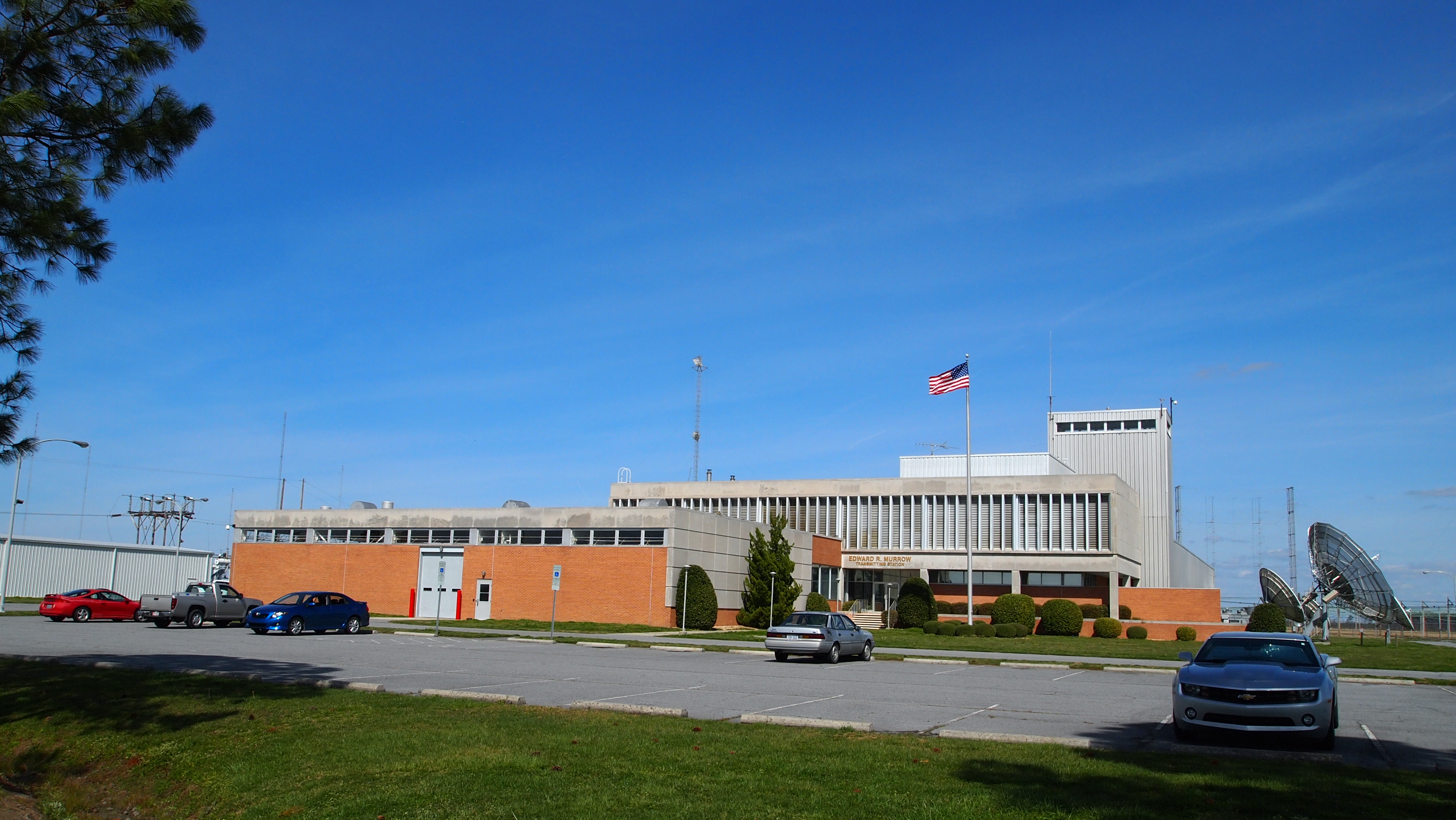
Edward R. Murrow Greenville Transmitting Station, the VOA broadcasting station in North Carolina's Inner Banks

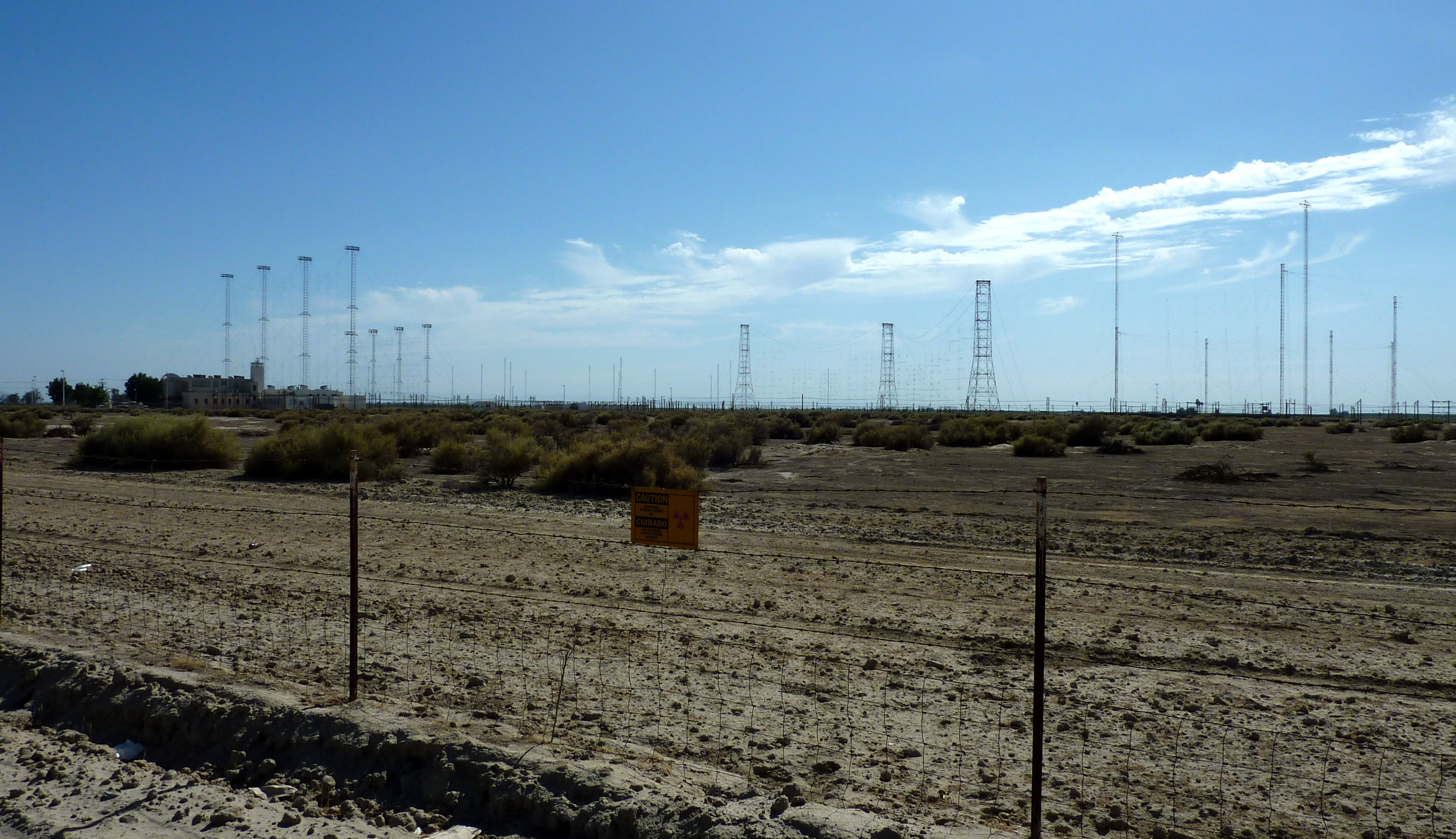
The Delano Transmitting Station was closed in 2007.

The Bethany Relay Station, operational from 1944 to 1994, was based on a 625-acre (2.53 km^{2}) site in Union Township (later West Chester Township) in Butler County, Ohio, near Cincinnati. Major transmitter upgrades first were undertaken around 1963, when shortwave and medium-wave transmitters were built, upgraded, or rebuilt. The site later became a recreational park with a Voice of America museum. Other former sites include California (Dixon and Delano), Hawaii, Okinawa, Liberia (Monrovia), Costa Rica, Belize, and at least two in Greece (Kavala and Rhodos).

Between 1983 and 1990, VOA made significant upgrades to transmission facilities in Botswana (Selebi-Phikwe), Morocco, Thailand (Udon Thani), Kuwait, and São Tomé (Almas). Some of them are shared with Radio Liberty and Radio Free Asia.

VOA and USAGM continue to operate shortwave radio transmitters and antenna farms at International Broadcasting Bureau Greenville Transmitting Station (known as "Site B") in the United States, close to Greenville, North Carolina. They do not use FCC-issued call signs, since the FCC does not regulate communications by other federal government agencies. The International Broadcasting Bureau also operates transmission facilities on São Tomé and Tinang, Concepcion, Tarlac, Philippines, for VOA.

=== Languages ===
The Voice of America website had five English-language broadcasts as of 2014 (worldwide, Learning English, Cambodia, Zimbabwe, and Tibet). Additionally, the VOA website has versions in 48 foreign languages.

Radio programs are marked with an "R"; television programs with a "T":

1. Afan Oromo ^{R}
2. Albanian ^{R, T}
3. Amharic ^{R}
4. Armenian ^{T}
5. Azerbaijani ^{T}
6. Bambara ^{R}
7. Bangla ^{R, T}
8. Bosnian ^{T}
9. Burmese ^{R, T}
10. Cantonese ^{R, T}
11. Dari Persian ^{R, T}
12. English ^{R, T}
13. French ^{R, T}
14. Georgian ^{R}
15. Haitian Creole ^{R}
16. Hausa ^{R}
17. Indonesian ^{R, T}
18. Khmer ^{R, T}
19. Kinyarwanda ^{R}
20. Kirundi
21. Korean ^{R}
22. Kurdish ^{R}
23. Lao ^{R}
24. Lingala ^{R}
25. Macedonian ^{T}
26. Mandarin ^{R, T}
27. Ndebele
28. Pashto ^{T}
29. Persian ^{R, T}
30. Portuguese ^{R}
31. Rohingya
32. Russian ^{T}
33. Sango ^{R}
34. Serbian ^{T}
35. Shona ^{R}
36. Sindhi
37. Somali ^{R}
38. Spanish ^{R, T}
39. Swahili ^{R}
40. Thai ^{R}
41. Tibetan ^{R, T}
42. Tigrinya ^{R}
43. Turkish ^{T}
44. Ukrainian ^{T}
45. Urdu ^{R, T}
46. Uzbek ^{R, T}
47. Vietnamese ^{R, T}
48. Wolof

The number of languages varies according to the priorities of the United States government and the world situation.

== Region-specific reception ==
Voice of America is seen by some as having a positive impact and serving the foreign policy of the United States. Others see it as American propaganda. Voice of America has attended to more remote areas that are poorly covered by other media, helping to boost democracy efforts by shining a spotlight on autocrats so the people can make them accountable.

=== China ===
A study was done on Chinese students in America. It found that through the VOA, they disapproved of the actions of the Chinese government. Another study was done on Chinese scholars in America, and found that the VOA had an effect on their political beliefs. Their political beliefs did not change in relation to China, though, as they did not tend to believe the VOA's reports on China.

In February 2013, a documentary released by China Central Television interviewed a Tibetan alleged self-immolator who survived his suicide attempt. The interviewee said he was motivated by Voice of America's broadcasts of commemorations of people who committed suicide in political self-immolation. VOA denied instigating self-immolations and demanded that the Chinese station retract its report.

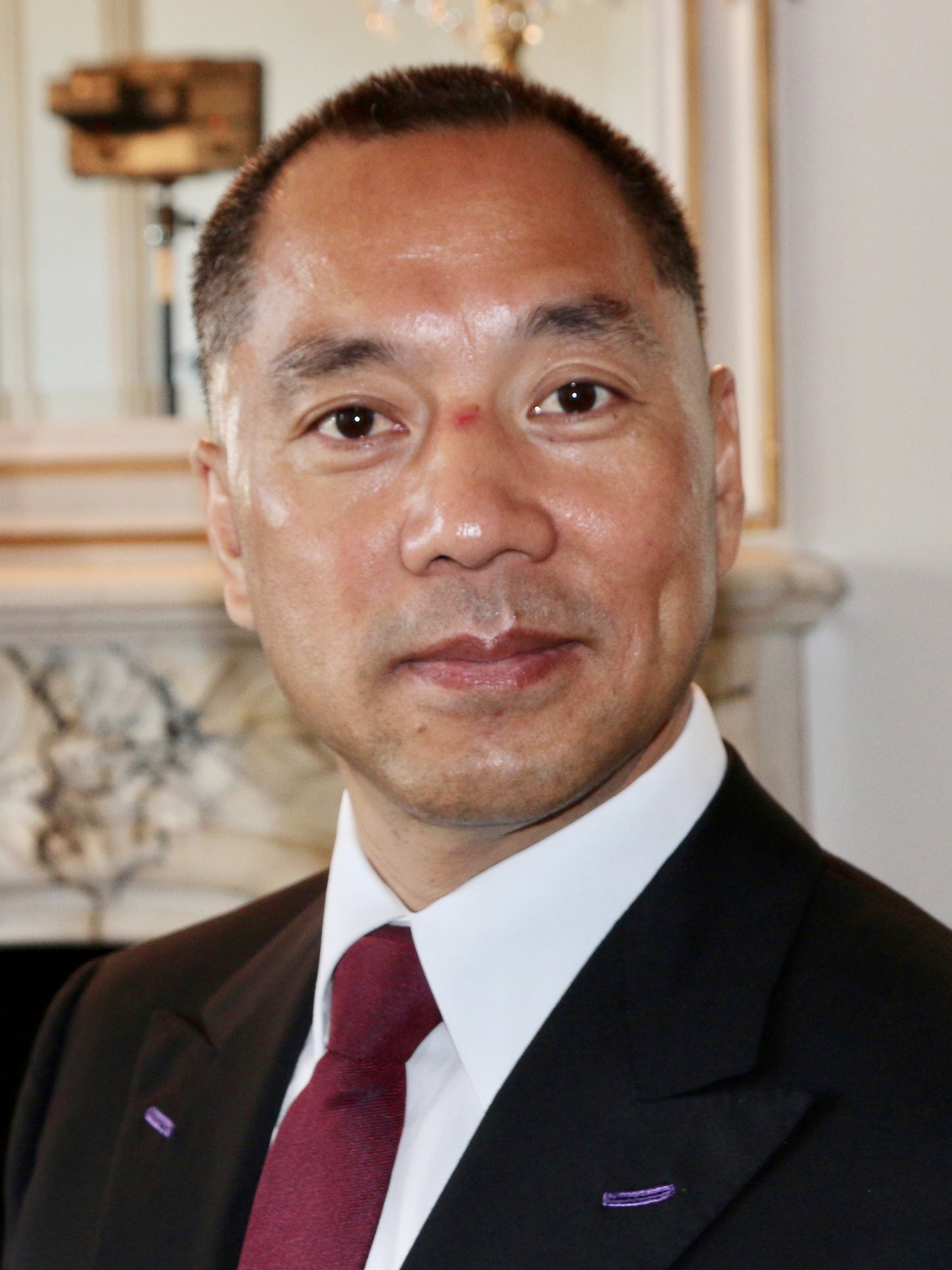
Guo Wengui

On April 19, 2017, the VOA Mandarin Service interviewed Chinese real estate tycoon Guo Wengui in a live broadcast. The government of China warned VOA representatives not to interview Guo about his "unsubstantiated allegations". During the interview, Guo said he had evidence of corruption among the members of the Politburo Standing Committee of China, the highest political authority of China. It was then abruptly halted by VOA leadership less than half-way into the three-hour interview. Guo's allegations involved Fu Zhenhua and Wang Qishan (a member of the Politburo Standing Committee, and the leader of the anti-graft movement). The following August, four U.S. Congressmen requested an investigation into the event, with the Office of Inspector General (OIG) concluding that the VOA leadership decision to curtail the Guo interview was based solely on journalistic best practices, rather than due to any pressure from the Chinese government. Another investigation by Mark Feldstein, Chair of Broadcast Journalism at the University of Maryland, College Park, came to similar conclusions, criticizing the VOA Mandarin Service interview team for not following instructions by VOA leadership.

=== Horn of Africa service ===
Peter Heinlein led the service from 2012 to 2014. In 2013, he wrote a complaint about the service, citing role confusion whereby non-journalist translators took on the role of journalists. The service was mostly seen as anti-Ethiopian government until 2018, when Negussie Mengesha, the head of the VOA Africa division for several years, met the newly appointed Ethiopian prime minister Abiy Ahmed. In May 2021, several former employees accused VOA's Amharic service, under Mengesha, of being biased in favor of the government of Ahmed and failing to report on atrocities committed during the Tigray War. VOA journalist Jason Patinkin reported the problems "at every level of the VOA hierarchy" and resigned, saying it had "sided with the perpetrators both by commission and omission" of "potential crimes against humanity, ethnic cleansing and perhaps even genocide". In June 2021, Mail & Guardian reported on an investigation which found that during the Tigray War, the only major foreign news service that was not harassed by Ethiopian security services was VOA. VOA frequently covered the Mai Kadra massacre, mostly attributed to Tigrayan youth and documented by Amnesty International, while later focusing on the Ethiopian government's dismissal of Amnesty International's report on the Axum massacre rather than on the methods and content of the report itself. A majority of the stories about the war only showed government or military officials' points of view. Instructions emailed to staff stated that the terms "civil war" and "war" were forbidden in reporting on the Tigray War, with Scott Stearns writing on November 14, according to Mail & Guardian, "There are to be no deviations from these instructions by any member of any Africa division language service on any platform."

=== Israel and Palestine ===
After the October 7, 2023, Hamas attack on Israel, an email was sent to Voice of America staff from the associate editor for news standards with guidance related to how to refer to the actions ("terrorist acts" or "acts of terror") and advice about how to refer to individual members of Hamas, i.e. to use the term "terrorist" only in direct quotes from sources. At the time, VOA was not the only news outlet with journalists discussing how to objectively refer to the Israeli–Palestinian conflict. Six Republican members of Congress signed a letter sent by Senator Bill Hagerty, which criticized and strongly objected to the editorial guidance about how to refer to individual members of Hamas. USAGM chief executive Amanda Bennett sent a letter to the senators to clarify that the VOA email was guidance only, and "There is no policy prohibiting the use of the words 'terror,' 'terrorism,' or 'terrorist'" at VOA, and stating the news organizations within USAGM "counsel care and attention in the use of the words but do not place any restrictions on the appropriate use." The controversy prompted Congress to reduce the budget of VOA's parent organization, USAGM.

=== Kurdistan and Iran ===
VOA's service in Iran had a negative impact on Kurds and Kurdistan according to the publication Kurdish Life in 2000. They claimed that the VOA exacerbated the conflict between the Talabani and the Barzani. They further claimed that the VOA covered up wrongful imprisonments, wrongful arrests, and the building of extremist mosques. According to the same publication, Kurds were being turned into fanatics, and a new generation of terrorists was forming because of the VOA. They claimed the VOA was doing this to help PUK.

On April 2, 2007, Abdul Malik Rigi, the leader of Jundullah, an Iranian Muslim Sunni Salafi militant group with possible links to al-Qaeda, appeared on Voice of America's Persian-language service. The interview was condemned by the Iranian government. He also alleges he had American support in an official TV broadcast. Jundullah was linked to attacks on both Iranian military and civilians. Rigi was captured by the Iranian security services and executed in 2010 in Evin Prison in Tehran.

=== Pakistan ===
The VOA's DEEWA Radio airs in Pakistan. Although in 2015 some listeners were suspicious that the program was promoting an American agenda, others said they were experiencing a positive effect. Some listeners felt that the programs were giving a voice to the voiceless, giving them a sense of empowerment. In 2018, the Pakistani authorities blocked the website of VOA's Pashto and Urdu language radio service.

=== Russia ===
In January 2016, upon his arrival in Moscow, Russian authorities detained and then deported Jeff Shell, the chairman of the Broadcasting Board of Governors that oversees the Voice of America, despite his having a valid Russian visa. Russian authorities did not explain their actions.

Round-the-clock broadcasting of Russian language TV news channel Current Time began on February 7, 2017.

In December 2017, under a new directive from Russia's Kremlin after a new law was passed by the State Duma (Russia's lower house of parliament) and the upper house Federation Council and signed by Russian president Vladimir Putin, Voice of America was deemed a "foreign agent" under the Russian foreign agent law. In June 2021, the Russian news agency TASS reported that Russia's state communications watchdog Roskomnadzor complained that the foreign agent Voice of America radio station challengingly refused to observe Russian law because it had not established a Russian legal entity. Roskomnadzor also said that VOA was as a foreign agent "obliged to mark their content and provide information about all aspects of their activity, including a detailed description of contacts with the authorities."

In March 2022, VOA and other news broadcasters, including the BBC, Radio Free Europe/Radio Liberty, and Deutsche Welle were blocked in Russia, as after the Russian invasion of Ukraine in February 2022, Russian authorities increased censorship of independent journalism, anti-war protests, and dissenting voices. Nevertheless, many Russians have used VPNs and other software to get around Russian government blocks. As of March 2022, VOA broadcasts were reaching people in Russia and the region through TV, FM and medium wave radio, digital, and direct-to-home satellite. In May 2023, Russia banned then-acting VOA chief Yolanda Lopez from ever entering the country.

=== Azerbaijan ===
From 2019 to 2025, Azerbaijani journalist and human rights activist Ulviyya Ali worked with the Azerbaijani Service of Voice of America, where she authored and broadcast over 1000 news-pieces and reports. Her work often focused on politically sensitive topics such as political trials in Azerbaijan, human rights violations, protests, rallies, and civil disobedience actions against the regime of Ilham Aliyev. During her journalistic activities, she faced multiple instances of detention, police obstruction, and ill-treatment. In February 2025, Voice of America journalist's accreditations in Azerbaijan were revoked. Ulviyya Ali was arrested in May 2025.

=== Turkey ===
On June 30, 2022, the Turkish media watchdog, Radio and Television Supreme Council (RTÜK), blocked access to VOA's website amerikaninsesi.com in Turkey because VOA had not applied for the necessary license, which would subject VOA to certain obligations. The RTÜK regulation requires foreign news outlets that publish in Turkey to apply for publication licenses, mandates that at least half of the media organization be owned by a Turkish citizen, and would force VOA to remove content deemed inappropriate by RTÜK. VOA Turkish subsequently broadcast over a different VOA website domain name, voaturkce.com, which in August 2023 was blocked as well. VOA said that "Given VOA's status as a public service international broadcaster legally required to provide 'accurate, objective, and comprehensive' news coverage to its global audience, VOA cannot comply with any directive intended to enable censorship." VOA Turkey, after it was blocked, shared instructions on its social media accounts as to how to use a VPN to access its content.

== Historical list of languages ==
Language	Target audience	from	to	Website	Remarks
English	Worldwide	1942	present	www.voanews.com	
Mandarin Chinese	Republic of China (1942–1949); People's Republic of China (1949–present)	1942	present	美国之音	see also Radio Free Asia
Cantonese	Guangdong; Guangxi; Hong Kong (1997–present); Macau (1999–present)	1942; 1949; 1987	1945; 1963 present	美國之音	see also Radio Free Asia
Brazilian Portuguese	Brazil	1942; 1946; 1961	1945; 1948; 2001	–	
Amoy	Fujian (1942–1945, 1951–1963); Japanese Taiwan (1941–1945); Taiwan (1951–1963)	1942; 1951	1945; 1963	–	
Tagalog/Filipino	Commonwealth of the Philippines (1942, 1945–1946); Philippine Executive Commission (1942–1943); Republic of the Philippines (1943–1945)	1942	1946	–	
Korean	Japanese Korea (1942–1945); People's Republic of Korea (1945); Soviet Civil Administration in North Korea (1945–1948); North Korea (1948–present); United States Army Military Government in Korea (1945–1948); South Korea (1948–2025)	1942	present	VOA 한국어	see also Radio Free Asia
Indonesian	Japanese-occupied Dutch East Indies (1942–1945); Dutch East Indies (1945–1949); Netherlands New Guinea (1949–1962) (United Nations) West New Guinea (UN Protectorate) (1962–1963); Republic of Indonesia (1945–1949); United States of Indonesia (1949–1950); Indonesia (1950–present)	1942	present	VOA Indonesia	see also Voice of America Indonesia
Turkish	Turkey	1942; 1948	1945 present	Amerika'nın Sesi; VOA Türkçe	
Spanish	Latin America	1942; 1946; 1953; 1961	1945; 1948; 1956 present	Voz de América	see also Radio y Televisión Martí
Persian	Imperial State of Iran (1942–1945, 1949–1960, 1964–1966); Islamic Republic of Iran (1979–present)	1942; 1949; 1964; 1979	1945; 1960; 1966 present	صدای آمریکا	see also Radio Farda
Thai	Thailand	1942; 1962; 1988	1958; 1988 present	วอยซ์ ออฟ อเมริกา	
Greek	Hellenic State (1942–1944); Axis-occupied Greece (1942–1944); Italian Islands of the Aegean (1942–1945); Kingdom of Greece (1944–1973); Hellenic Republic (1973–2014)	1942	2014	Φωνή της Αμερικής (no longer active, kept for historical reasons)	
Bulgarian	Kingdom of Bulgaria (1942–1946) (People's Republic of Bulgaria) Bulgarian People's Republic (1946–1989); Bulgaria (1989–2004)	1942	2004	–	see also Radio Free Europe
Czech	Protectorate of Bohemia and Moravia (1942–1945); Czech-inhabited lands of Czechoslovak Republic (1945–1960); Czech-inhabited lands of Czechoslovak Socialist Republic (1960–1969) (Czech Socialist Republic) Czech SR (1969–1990); Czech Republic (1990–2004)	1942	2004	–	see also Radio Free Europe
Hungarian	Kingdom of Hungary; Hungarian Republic (1946–1949); Hungarian People's Republic (1949–1989); Hungary (1989–1993)	1942	2004	–	see also Radio Free Europe
Polish	General Government of Polish Region (1942–1944); Polish areas annexed by Nazi Germany; Republic of Poland (1944–1945); Republic of Poland (1945–1947); Polish People's Republic (1947–1989); Poland (1990–2004)	1942	2004	–	see also Radio Free Europe
Romanian	Kingdom of Romania (1942–1947); Romanian People's Republic (1947–1965); Socialist Republic of Romania (1965–1989); Romania (1989–2004)	1942	2004	–	see also Radio Free Europe
Slovak	Slovak Republic (1942–1945); Slovak-inhabited lands of Czechoslovak Republic (1945–1960); Slovak-inhabited lands of Czechoslovak Socialist Republic (1960–1969) (Slovak Socialist Republic) Slovak SR (1969–1990); Slovakia (1990–2004)	1942	2004	–	see also Radio Free Europe
Arabic	Arab World	1942; 1950	1945; 2002	–	see also Radio Sawa and Alhurra
Spanish	Spanish State (1942–1955, 1955–1975); Spain (1975–1993)	1942; 1955	1955; 1993	– (for local radio stations)	
Portuguese	Portugal (1942–1945, 1951–1953); Portugal (1976–1987, 1987–1993)	1942; 1951; 1976; 1987	1945; 1953; 1987; 1993	– (for local radio stations)	
German	German Reich (1942–1943); German-occupied Austria (1942–1945); Greater German Reich (1943–1945); Allied-occupied Germany (1945–1949); Saar Protectorate (1947–1956); Federal Republic of Germany (1949–1960); Allied-occupied Berlin (1949–1960); German Democratic Republic (1949–1960); Germany (1991–1993)	1942; 1991	1960; 1993	–	
Japanese	Empire of Japan (1942–1945); Occupied Japan (1951–1952); Japan (1952–1962)	1942; 1951	1945; 1962	–	
French	French State (1942–1944); Free France (1942–1944); Military Administration in France (1942–1944); French- and Walloon-inhabited lands of Military Administration in Belgium and Northern France (1942–1944); French- and Walloon-inhabited lands of Reichskommissariat of Belgium and Northern France (1944); Italian Military Administration in France (1942–1943); Occupied Corsica (1942–1943); French Republic (1944–1946); French Republic (1946–1958); French Republic (1958–1961)	1942	1961	–	
Italian	Kingdom of Italy (1942–1945); Italian Republic (1951–1957); Free Territory of Trieste (1951–1954)	1942; 1951	1945; 1957	–	
Finnish	Finland	1942; 1951	1945; 1953	–	
Afrikaans	Union of South Africa	1942	1949	–	
Danish	Denmark	1942	1945	–	
Flemish	Flemish-inhabited lands of Military Administration in Belgium and Northern France (1942–1944); Flemish-inhabited lands of Reichskommissariat of Belgium and Northern France (1944); Reichsgau Flandern (1944–1945)	1942	1945	–	
Norwegian	Reichskommissariat Norwegen	1942	1945	–	
Serbian	Territory of the Military Commander in Serbia + German-occupied Montenegro (1943–1944); Federated State of Serbia + Federated State of Montenegro (1944–1946); People's Republic of Serbia + People's Republic of Montenegro (1946–1963); Socialist Republic of Serbia + Socialist Republic of Montenegro (1963–1992); Federal Republic of Yugoslavia (1992–2003); State Union of Serbia and Montenegro (2003–2006); Serbia (2006–present); Montenegro (2006–present)	1943	present	Glas Amerike	see also Radio Free Europe
Albanian	Albanian Kingdom (1943–1944); Democratic Government of Albania (1944–1945); People's Republic of Albania (1951–1976); People's Socialist Republic of Albania (1976–1998); Republic of Albania (1998–present); Republic of Kosovo (2008–present)	1943; 1951	1945 present	Zëri i Amerikës	see also Radio Free Europe
Burmese	State of Burma (1943–1945); Union of Burma (1951–1974); Socialist Republic of the Union of Burma (1974–1988); Union of Myanmar (1988–2011); Myanmar (2011–present)	1943; 1951	1945 present	ဗွီအိုအေ မြန်မာဌာန	see also Radio Free Asia
Vietnamese	French Indochina (1943–1945); Empire of Vietnam (1945); Protectorate of Tonkin + Protectorate of Annam + French Cochinchina (1945–1946); State of Vietnam (1951–1955); North Vietnam (1955–1976); South Vietnam (1955–1975); North Vietnamese-occupied South Vietnam (1969–1976); Vietnam (1976–present)	1943; 1951	1946 present	Ðài Tiếng nói Hoa Kỳ	see also Radio Free Asia
Croatian	Independent State of Croatia (1943–1945); Federated State of Croatia (1945–1946); People's Republic of Croatia (1946–1963); Socialist Republic of Croatia (1963–1990); Republic of Croatia (1990–1991); Croatia (1991–2011)	1943	2011	–	see also Radio Free Europe
Swedish	Sweden	1943	1945	–	
Slovene	Slovenian-inhabited lands of Reichsgau Steiermark, Reichsgau Kärnten and Operational Zone of the Adriatic Littoral (1944–1945); People's Republic of Slovenia (1949–1963); Socialist Republic of Slovenia (1963–1990); Slovenia (1990–2004)	1944; 1949	1945; 2004	–	
Wu Chinese	Shanghai	1944	1946	–	
Dutch	Reichskommissariat Niederlande	1944	1945	–	
Icelandic	Kingdom of Iceland	1944	1944	–	
Russian	(Russian Soviet Federative Socialist Republic) Russian SFSR (1947–1991); Russia (1991–present)	1947	present	Голос Америки	see also Radio Liberty
Ukrainian	(Ukrainian Soviet Socialist Republic) Ukrainian SSR (1949–1991); Ukraine (1991–present)	1949	present	Голос Америки	see also Radio Liberty
Armenian	(Armenian Soviet Socialist Republic) Armenian SSR (1951–1991); Armenia (1991–present)	1951	present (web)	Ամերիկայի Ձայն	see also Radio Liberty
Georgian	(Georgian Soviet Socialist Republic) Georgian SSR (1951–1991); Georgia (1991–present)	1951	present (web)	–	see also Radio Liberty
Urdu	Pakistan	1951; 1954	1953 present	وائس آف امریکہ	
Azerbaijani	(Azerbaijan Soviet Socialist Republic) Azeri SSR (1951–1953, 1982–1991); Azerbaijan (1991–present)	1951; 1982	1953 present (web)	Amerikanın Səsi	see also Radio Liberty
Hindi	Northern India	1951; 1954	1953; 2008	–	
Estonian	(Estonian Soviet Socialist Republic) Estonian SSR (1951–1990); Estonia (1990–2004)	1951	2004	–	see also Radio Liberty
Latvian	(Latvian Soviet Socialist Republic) Latvian SSR (1951–1990); Latvia (1990–2004)	1951	2004	–	see also Radio Liberty
Lithuanian	(Lithuanian Soviet Socialist Republic) Lithuanian SSR (1951–1990); Lithuania (1990–2004)	1951	2004	–	see also Radio Liberty
Malayan	Federation of Malaya	1951	1955	–	
Hakka	Hakka-inhabited lands of Southern People's Republic of China	1951	1954	–	
Hebrew	Israel	1951	1953	–	
Swatow	Shantou	1951	1953	–	
Tatar	Tatar ASSR	1951	1953	–	see also Radio Liberty
Tamil	Madras State (1954–1969); Tamil Nadu (1969–1970); Dominion of Ceylon (Sri Lanka, ex-Ceylon)	1954	1970	–	
Khmer	Kingdom of Cambodia (1955–1957, 1962–1970); Khmer Republic (1970–1975); Democratic Kampuchea (1975–1979); People's Republic of Kampuchea (1979–1989); State of Cambodia (1989–1993); Kingdom of Cambodia (1993–present)	1955; 1962	1957 present	វីអូអេ www.voacambodia.com	see also Radio Free Asia
Malayalam	Kerala; Laccadive, Minicoy and Amindivi Islands	1956	1961	–	
Gujarati	Gujarati-inhabited lands of Bombay State	1956	1958	–	
Telugu	Andhra Pradesh	1956	1958	–	
Belarusian	(Byelorussian Soviet Socialist Republic) Byelorussian SSR	1956	1957	–	see also Radio Liberty
Bengali	Bangladesh; India	1958	present	ভয়েস অফ আমেরিকা	
French (to Africa)		1960	present	VOA Afrique	
Sindhi	Pakistan	July 2022	present	VOA Sindhi	
Lao	Kingdom of Laos (1962–1975); Lao People's Democratic Republic (1975–present)	1962	present	ສຽງອາເມຣິກາ ວີໂອເອ	see also Radio Free Asia
Swahili		1962	present	Sauti ya Amerika	
English (to Africa)		August 4 1963	present	www.voaafrica.com www.voazimbabwe.com	
Uzbek	(Uzbek Soviet Socialist Republic) Uzbek SSR (1972–1991); Uzbekistan (1991–present)	1972	present	Amerika Ovozi	see also Radio Liberty
Portuguese (to Africa)		1976	present	Voz da América	
Hausa	Nigeria	January 21 1979	present	Muryar Amurka	
Dari	Democratic Republic of Afghanistan (1980–1987); Republic of Afghanistan (1987–1992); Islamic State of Afghanistan (1992–1996, 2001–2002); Islamic Emirate of Afghanistan (1996–2001); Transitional Islamic State of Afghanistan (2002–2004); Islamic Republic of Afghanistan (2004–2021)	1980	present	صدای امریکا	
Amharic	Ethiopia	September 1982	present	የአሜሪካ ድምፅ	
Pashto	Pashtun-inhabited lands of Afghanistan	1982	present	اشنا راډیو	
Creole	Haiti	1987	present	Lavwadlamerik	
Tibetan	Tibet Autonomous Region; Qinghai; Bhutan	1991	present	ཨ་རིའི་རླུང་འཕྲིན་ཁང་། www.voatibetanenglish.com	see also Radio Free Asia
Kurdish	Iraqi Kurdistan; Autonomous Administration of North and East Syria; Kurdish-inhabited lands of Turkey; Kurdish-inhabited lands of Iran	1992	present	ده‌نگی ئه‌مه‌ریکا; Dengê Amerîka	
Somali	Somalia	1992; 2007	1995 present	VOA Somali	
Nepali	Kingdom of Nepal	1992	1993	–	
Afaan Oromo	Oromia Region	July 1996	present	Sagalee Ameerikaa	
Bosnian	Bosnia and Herzegovina	1996	present	Glas Amerike	see also Radio Free Europe
Kinyarwanda/Kirundi	Rwanda; Burundi; Eastern Democratic Republic of the Congo; Southern Uganda; Northwestern Tanzania	July 1996	present	Ijwi ry'Amerika	
Tigrinya	Eritrea	July 1996	present	ድምፂ ረድዮ ኣሜሪካ	
Macedonian	(North Macedonia) Republic of Macedonia	1999	2008	–	see also Radio Free Europe
Ndebele	Zimbabwe	2003	present	VOA Ndebele	
Shona	Zimbabwe; Mozambique	2003	present	VOA Shona	
Pashto	Pashtun-inhabited lands of Pakistan	2006	present	ډیوه ریډیو	
Bambara	Mali	March 2013	present	VOA Bambara	

== See also ==
- List of international broadcasters
- List of public broadcasters by country
- List of world news channels
