= 2005 Portuguese local elections =

- 9 October 2005

All 308 Portuguese municipalities and 4,260 Portuguese Parishes All 2,046 local government councils
- Opinion polls
- Turnout: 61.0% ▲0.9 pp
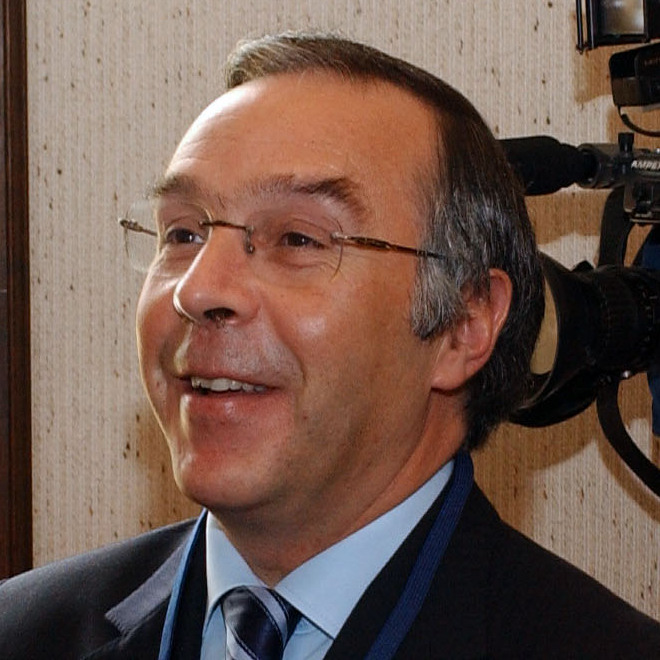

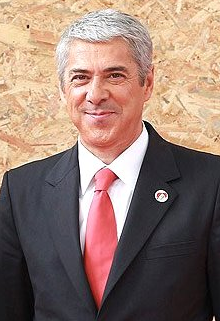

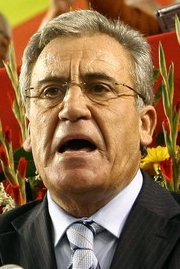
	First party	Second party	Third party
Leader	Luís Marques Mendes	José Sócrates	Jerónimo de Sousa
Party	PSD	PS	PCP
Alliance			CDU
Last election	159 mayors, 41.1%	113 mayors, 37.1%	28 mayors, 10.6%
Popular vote	2,151,006	1,931,774	590,598
Percentage	39.9%	35.8%	11.0%
Swing	▼1.2 pp	▼1.3 pp	▲0.4 pp
Mayors	158	109	32
Mayors +/–	▼1	▼4	▲4
Councillors	907	852	203
Councillors +/–	▲1	▲2	▲4

Local elections were held in Portugal on 9 October 2005. The election consisted of three separate elections in the 308 Portuguese municipalities, the election for the Municipal Chambers, another election for the Municipal Assembly and a last one for the lower-level Parish Assembly, whose winner is elected parish president. This last was held separately in the more than 4,000 parishes around the country.

The Socialist Party can be considered the main loser in this election due to a slight loss of seats and also a decrease in its vote share, compared with the 2001 results.

On the right, the Social Democratic Party gained some municipalities from the Socialists, some of them in coalition with the People's Party, but overall elected 158 mayors, minus one compared with 2001. The People's Party (CDS–PP) was left reduced to only one municipality in stand-alone candidacies, Ponte de Lima, continuing its decline in comparison, for example, with the 36 mayors achieved in 1976.

On the left, the Unitary Democratic Coalition, led by the Communist Party, regained some of its former influence, taking 4 municipalities and several parishes from the Socialists in the districts of Beja, Évora, Setúbal and Leiria, achieving a total of 32 mayors, and winning, for the first time, the election in Peniche. The Left Bloc kept the presidency of its single municipality, Salvaterra de Magos.

The election was also remarkable for the victory of independent candidates, most of them former Socialist, Social Democratic and People's Party candidates, who were expelled from or lost the confidence of their respective parties due to corruption allegations, and yet were re-elected. The best known were Valentim Loureiro in Gondomar, Fátima Felgueiras in Felgueiras and Isaltino Morais in Oeiras.

== Background ==
=== Electoral system ===
All 308 municipalities are allocated a certain number of councilors to elect corresponding to the number of registered voters in a given municipality. Each party or coalition must present a list of candidates. The winner of the most voted list for the municipal council is automatically elected mayor, similar to first-past-the-post (FPTP). The lists are closed and the seats in each municipality are apportioned according to the D'Hondt method. Unlike in national legislative elections, independent lists are allowed to run.

=== By-elections (2001–2005) ===
During the normal four-year term of local governments, thirty-five parishes held a by-election for parish assemblies. No municipal council by-elections were held.

== Parties ==
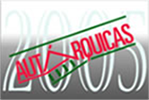
Official logo of the election.

The main political forces involved in the election were:

- Left Bloc (BE)
- CDS – People's Party (CDS–PP)
- Unitary Democratic Coalition (CDU)
- Socialist Party (PS)
- Social Democratic Party (PSD)

== Voter turnout ==
The table below shows voter turnout throughout election day.

Turnout	Time								
Turnout	12:00			16:00			19:00		
Turnout	2001	2005	±	2001	2005	±	2001	2005	±
Total	—N/a	21.35%	—N/a	42.50%	48.00%	▲5.50 pp	60.13%	60.94%	▲0.81 pp

== Results ==
=== Municipal Councils ===
==== National summary of votes and seats ====
Summary of the 9 October 2005 Municipal Councils elections results
Parties	Votes	%	±pp swing	Candidacies	Councillors		Mayors	
Parties	Votes	%	±pp swing	Candidacies	Total	±	Total	±
Socialist	1,931,774	35.84	▲1.7	307	852	▲25	109	▼4
Social Democratic	1,523,760	28.27	▼0.0	245	743	▼33	138	▼4
Democratic Unity Coalition	590,598	10.96	▲0.4	301	203	▲4	32	▲4
Social Democratic / People's	497,077	9.22	▲0.2	42	136	▲22	18	▲3
People's	165,712	3.07	▼0.6	185	30	▼9	1	▼2
Left Bloc	159,254	2.95	▲1.8	111	7	▲1	1	0
Independents	133,146	2.47	▲0.9	27	45	▲14	7	▲4
PSD / CDS–PP / PPM / MPT	71,146	1.32	—	3	11	—	1	—
PSD / CDS–PP / PPM	56,652	1.05	▼1.1	12	15	▲5	1	0
Portuguese Workers' Communist	15,476	0.29	▼0.0	19	0	0	0	0
Humanist	5,103	0.09	▲0.0	13	0	0	0	0
New Democracy	2,048	0.04	—	4	0	—	0	—
National Renovator	1,752	0.03	▼0.0	5	0	0	0	0
People's Monarchist	1,730	0.03	▲0.0	5	0	0	0	0
PSD / CDS–PP / MPT	1,664	0.03	—	1	2	—	0	—
Earth	1,589	0.03	▼0.2	4	0	▼4	0	▼1
PSD / PPM	707	0.01	▼2.5	1	0	▼8	0	▼1
PND / PPM	439	0.01	—	1	0	—	0	—
National Solidarity	233	0.00	—	1	0	—	0	—
People's / Social Democratic	109	0.00	▼0.2	1	0	▼6	0	0
CDS–PP / PSD / PPM	11	0.00	—	1	0	—	0	—
**Total valid**	**5,159,980**	**95.71**	**▼0.6**	—	**2,046**	**▲2**	**308**	**0**
Blank ballots	138,449	2.57	▲0.4					
Invalid ballots	92,142	1.71	▲0.2					
**Total**	**5,390,571**	**100.00**						
Registered voters/turnout	8,840,223	60.98	▲0.9					

==== Municipality map ====
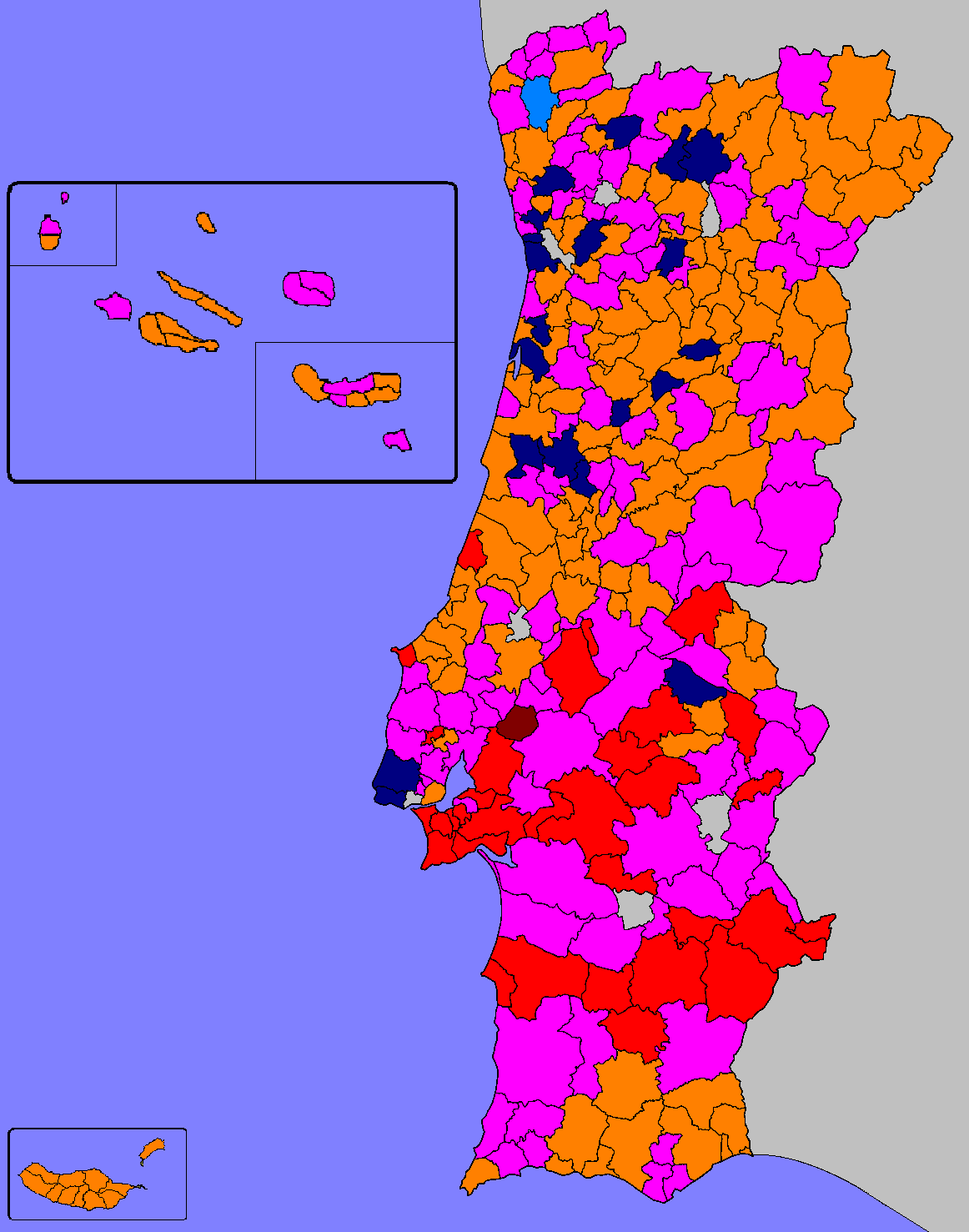
Most voted parties or coalitions in each Municipality. Municipalities won by: ■ - PSD: 138 ■ - PS: 109 ■ - CDU: 32 ■ - BE: 1 ■ - CDS–PP: 1 ■ - PSD coalitions: 20 ■ - Independents: 7

==== City control ====
The following table lists party control in all district capitals, highlighted in bold, as well as in municipalities above 100,000 inhabitants. Population estimates from the 2001 Census.

Municipality	Population	Previous control	New control
Almada	160,825	Unitary Democratic Coalition (CDU)	Unitary Democratic Coalition (CDU)
Amadora	175,872	Socialist Party (PS)	Socialist Party (PS)
**Aveiro**	73,335	Socialist Party (PS)	PSD / CDS–PP
Barcelos	122,096	Social Democratic Party (PSD)	Social Democratic Party (PSD)
**Beja**	35,762	Unitary Democratic Coalition (CDU)	Unitary Democratic Coalition (CDU)
**Braga**	169,192	Socialist Party (PS)	Socialist Party (PS)
**Bragança**	34,750	Social Democratic Party (PSD)	Social Democratic Party (PSD)
Cascais	170,683	PSD / CDS–PP	PSD / CDS–PP
**Castelo Branco**	55,708	Socialist Party (PS)	Socialist Party (PS)
**Coimbra**	148,443	PSD / CDS–PP / PPM	PSD / CDS–PP / PPM
**Évora**	56,519	Socialist Party (PS)	Socialist Party (PS)
**Faro**	58,051	Social Democratic Party (PSD)	Socialist Party (PS)
**Funchal**	103,961	Social Democratic Party (PSD)	Social Democratic Party (PSD)
Gondomar	159,096	Social Democratic Party (PSD)	Independent (IND)
**Guarda**	43,822	Socialist Party (PS)	Socialist Party (PS)
Guimarães	159,576	Socialist Party (PS)	Socialist Party (PS)
**Leiria**	119,847	Social Democratic Party (PSD)	Social Democratic Party (PSD)
**Lisbon** (details)	564,657	PSD / PPM	Social Democratic Party (PSD)
Loures	199,059	Socialist Party (PS)	Socialist Party (PS)
Maia	120,111	PSD / CDS–PP	PSD / CDS–PP
Matosinhos	167,026	Socialist Party (PS)	Socialist Party (PS)
Odivelas	133,847	Socialist Party (PS)	Socialist Party (PS)
Oeiras	162,128	Social Democratic Party (PSD)	Independent (IND)
**Ponta Delgada**	65,854	Social Democratic Party (PSD)	Social Democratic Party (PSD)
**Portalegre**	25,980	Social Democratic Party (PSD)	Social Democratic Party (PSD)
**Porto** (details)	263,131	PSD / CDS–PP	PSD / CDS–PP
**Santarém**	63,563	Socialist Party (PS)	Social Democratic Party (PSD)
Santa Maria da Feira	135,964	Social Democratic Party (PSD)	Social Democratic Party (PSD)
Seixal	150,271	Unitary Democratic Coalition (CDU)	Unitary Democratic Coalition (CDU)
**Setúbal**	113,934	Unitary Democratic Coalition (CDU)	Unitary Democratic Coalition (CDU)
Sintra	363,749	PSD / CDS–PP	PSD / CDS–PP / PPM / MPT
Viana do Castelo	88,631	Socialist Party (PS)	Socialist Party (PS)
Vila Franca de Xira	122,908	Socialist Party (PS)	Socialist Party (PS)
Vila Nova de Famalicão	127,567	PSD / CDS–PP	PSD / CDS–PP
Vila Nova de Gaia	288,749	PSD / CDS–PP	PSD / CDS–PP
**Vila Real**	49,957	Social Democratic Party (PSD)	Social Democratic Party (PSD)
**Viseu**	93,501	Social Democratic Party (PSD)	Social Democratic Party (PSD)

=== Municipal Assemblies ===
==== National summary of votes and seats ====
Summary of the 9 October 2005 Municipal Assemblies elections results
Parties	Votes	%	±pp swing	Candidacies	Mandates	
Parties	Votes	%	±pp swing	Candidacies	Total	±
Socialist	1,923,845	35.69	▲1.7	307	2,794	▲73
Social Democratic	1,454,654	26.98	▼0.2	245	2,416	▼52
Democratic Unity Coalition	628,987	11.67	▲0.6	301	722	▲13
Social Democratic / People's	454,972	8.44	▼0.9	41	407	▼20
Left Bloc	212,669	3.94	▲2.4	115	114	▲86
People's	175,943	3.26	▼1.0	162	190	▼63
Independents	115,999	2.15	▲1.0	25	121	▲28
PSD / CDS–PP / PPM	90,676	1.68	▲0.5	13	73	▲33
PSD / CDS–PP / PPM / MPT	66,190	1.23	—	3	27	—
Portuguese Workers' Communist	8,620	0.16	▲0.0	9	1	0
People's / Social Democratic	2,768	0.05	▼0.0	2	6	▼13
PSD / CDS–PP / MPT	1,641	0.03	—	1	6	—
Earth	1,590	0.03	▼0.2	1	0	▼18
New Democracy	1,590	0.03	—	2	1	—
People's Monarchist	1,011	0.02	▲0.0	6	5	▲5
PND / PPM	831	0.02	—	1	0	—
PSD / PPM	760	0.01	▼2.4	1	2	▼21
Humanist	200	0.00	0.0	2	0	0
CDS–PP / PSD / PPM	8	0.00	—	1	0	—
**Total valid**	**5,142,954**	**95.39**	**▼0.6**	—	**6,885**	**▲9**
Blank ballots	154,283	2.86	▲0.4			
Invalid ballots	93,925	1.74	▲0.2			
**Total**	**5,391,162**	**100.00**				
Registered voters/turnout	8,840,223	60.98	▲0.9			

=== Parish Assemblies ===
==== National summary of votes and seats ====
Summary of the 9 October 2005 Parish Assemblies elections results
Parties	Votes	%	±pp swing	Candidacies	Mandates		Presidents	
Parties	Votes	%	±pp swing	Candidacies	Total	±	Total	±
Socialist	1,907,721	35.45	▲1.6	3,711	13,484	▲289	1,518	▼5
Social Democratic	1,434,321	26.65	▲0.1	3,065	12,451	▲303	1,723	▲74
Democratic Unity Coalition	644,535	11.98	▲0.8	2,239	2,555	▲89	244	▲12
Social Democratic / People's	411,517	7.65	▼0.6	529	2,064	▼60	219	▲4
Independents	245,740	4.57	▲0.2	568	2,200	▼207	292	▼19
Left Bloc	146,898	2.73	▲1.6	448	229	▲183	3	▼3
People's	144,328	2.68	▼0.9	1,043	822	▼148	65	▼14
PSD / CDS–PP / PPM / MPT	95,175	1.77	—	45	216	—	19	—
PSD / CDS–PP / PPM	84,398	1.57	▼0.7	125	400	▲98	34	▲2
Portuguese Workers' Communist	3,635	0.07	▼0.0	28	0	▼1	0	0
Earth	3,100	0.06	▼0.1	7	23	▼97	3	▼15
New Democracy	2,809	0.05	—	16	6	—	0	—
PSD / CDS–PP / MPT	1,756	0.03	—	12	32	—	3	—
People's / Social Democratic	1,448	0.03	▼0.1	2	10	▼57	2	▼6
Humanist	824	0.02	▲0.0	10	0	0	0	0
PSD / PPM	807	0.02	▼2.3	5	6	▼259	0	▼18
National Solidarity	72	0.00	—	5	0	—	0	—
National Renovator	38	0.00	—	1	0	—	0	—
People's Monarchist	27	0.00	0.0	1	0	▼1	0	0
**Total valid**	**5,129,149**	**95.32**	**▼0.7**	—	**34,498**	**▼129**	**4,125**	**▼4**
Blank ballots	151,527	2.82	▲0.5					
Invalid ballots	101,067	1.88	▲0.2					
**Total**	**5,381,759**	**100.00**						
Registered voters/turnout	8,840,223	60.88	▲0.9					

=== Maps ===
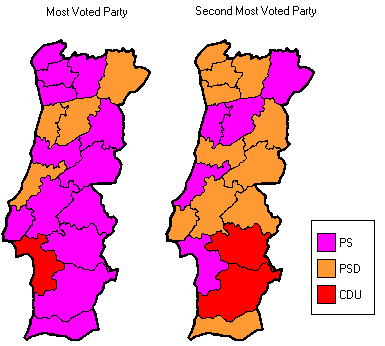
The first and the second most voted parties in Municipal Assemblies in each district. (Azores and Madeira are not shown)

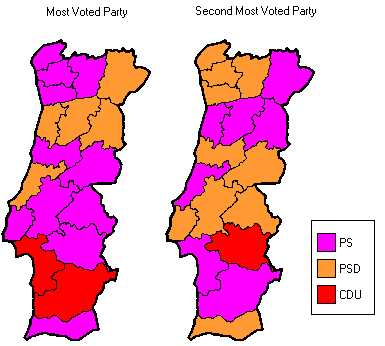
The first and the second most voted parties in Parish Assemblies in each district. (Azores and Madeira are not shown)

=== Notes ===
- **Democratic Unity Coalition (CDU)** is composed of the **Portuguese Communist Party (PCP)**, **"The Greens" (PEV)** and the **Democratic Intervention (ID)**.
- The different coalitions between the **Social Democratic Party (PSD)**, the **People's Party (CDS–PP)**, the **People's Monarchist Party (PPM)** or the **Earth Party (MPT)** appear because each municipality has its own election.
- The **number of candidacies** expresses the number of municipalities or parishes in which the party or coalition presented lists.
- The **number of mandates** expresses the number of municipal deputies in the Municipal Assembly election and the number of parish deputies in the Parish Assembly election.
- The turnout varies because one may choose not to vote for all the organs.
