= Opinion polling for the 2005 Portuguese local elections =

In the run up to the 2005 Portuguese local elections, various organisations carried out opinion polling to gauge voting intention in several municipalities across Portugal. Results of such polls are displayed in this article. The date range for these opinion polls are from the previous local elections, held on 16 December 2001, to the day the next elections were held, on 9 October 2005.

== Polling ==
=== Águeda ===
Polling firm/Link	Fieldwork date	Sample size	PSD	PS	CDU	BE	CDS	O	Lead
2005 local election	9 Oct 2005	—	40.0; 3	44.3; 4	3.3; 0	2.2; 0	5.6; 0	4.6	4.3
REGIPOM	27 Jul–12 Aug 2005	151	16.7	33.3	2.4	—	—	47.6	16.6
GEMEO/IPAM	26–27 Jul 2005	400	25.5	29.3	—	—	3.1	42.0	3.8
2001 local election	16 Dec 2001	—	58.0; 5	33.7; 2	4.4; 0	—	—	3.9	24.3

=== Albergaria-a-Velha ===
Polling firm/Link	Fieldwork date	Sample size	PSD	CDS	PS	CDU	BE	O	Lead
2005 local election	9 Oct 2005	—	57.2; 4	23.1; 2	12.0; 1	2.1; 0	1.8; 0	3.8	34.1
GEMEO/IPAM	1–2 Sep 2005	500	34.5	10.5	8.4	—	—	46.6	24.0
2001 local election	16 Dec 2001	—	42.3; 4	41.2; 3	8.3; 0	1.3; 0	0.8; 0	6.1; 0	1.1

=== Albufeira ===
Polling firm/Link	Fieldwork date	Sample size	PSD	PS	CDU	CDS	O	Lead
2005 local election	9 Oct 2005	—	62.5; 5	26.3; 2	4.8; 0	1.9; 0	4.5	36.2
GEMEO/IPAM	30 Sep–2 Oct 2005	450	51.6	26.4	2.4	2.0	17.6	25.2
2001 local election	16 Dec 2001	—	48.0; 4	36.3; 3	5.5; 0	5.5; 0	4.7	11.7

=== Amarante ===
Polling firm/Link	Fieldwork date	Sample size	PS	PSD	BE	CDU	AFT	O	Lead
2005 local election	9 Oct 2005	—	41.9; 3	25.7; 2	1.2; 0	1.3; 0	27.6; 2	2.3	14.3
Eurosondagem	16–17 Jul 2005	710	31.2	9.7	3.5	2.1	37.9	15.6	6.7
IPOM	24 May 2005	400	20	12.5	—	—	38	29.5	18
2001 local election	16 Dec 2001	—	46.7; 4	40.5; 3	3.7; 0	2.7; 0	—	6.4; 0	6.2

=== Arouca ===
Polling firm/Link	Fieldwork date	Sample size	PS	PSD CDS PPM	CDU	IND	O	Lead
2005 local election	9 Oct 2005	—	35.1; 3	32.6; 2	6.3; 0	22.7; 2	3.3	2.5
GEMEO/IPAM	30–31 Aug 2005	500	16.7	28.6	3.8	10.7	40.2	11.9
2001 local election	16 Dec 2001	—	53.9; 5	41.8; 2 (Note: Sum of the PSD and CDS separate results in 2001.)	1.4; 0	—	6.4; 0	12.1

=== Aveiro ===
Polling firm/Link	Fieldwork date	Sample size	PS	PSD CDS	CDU	BE	O	Lead
2005 local election	9 Oct 2005	—	39.3; 4	47.5; 5	4.4; 0	3.5; 0	5.2	8.2
GEMEO/IPAM	22–24 Sep 2005	500	47	44	3	3	3	3
GEMEO/IPAM	9–10 May 2005	300	47.3	17.7	1.5	—	33.5	29.6
2001 local election	16 Dec 2001	—	50.6; 5	42.2; 4	3.5; 0	—	3.8	8.4

=== Barreiro ===
Polling firm/Link	Fieldwork date	Sample size	PS	CDU	PSD	BE	O	Lead
2005 local election	9 Oct 2005	—	34.5; 4	41.5; 4	11.3; 1	6.4; 0	6.3; 0	7.0
REGIPOM	28 Sep 2005	450	46.2	34.8	8.8	1.7	8.5	11.4
REGIPOM	12–17 Aug 2005	127	21.4	11.4	4.9	—	62.9	10.0
2001 local election	16 Dec 2001	—	41.3; 4	40.3; 4	10.4; 1	2.4; 0	5.6; 0	1.0

=== Braga ===
Polling firm/Link	Fieldwork date	Sample size	PS	PSD CDS	CDU	BE	O	Lead
2005 local election	9 Oct 2005	—	44.5; 6	38.9; 5	7.1; 0	4.4; 0	5.2; 0	5.6
IPOM	24–25 Sep 2005	599	34.9	31.9	3.0	2.5	27.7	3.0
Eurosondagem	7–8 Sep 2005	1,010	50.0	33.0	7.7	5.7	3.6	17.0
Eurosondagem	19–21 Apr 2005	1,010	48.9	30.0	5.6	4.5	11.0	18.9
2001 local election	16 Dec 2001	—	47.7; 6	35.3; 4	8.8; 1	3.0; 0	5.2; 0	12.4

=== Cantanhede ===
Polling firm/Link	Fieldwork date	Sample size	PSD	PS	CDS	CDU	O	Lead
2005 local election	9 Oct 2005	—	55.5; 4	38.4; 3	1.4; 0	1.4; 0	3.3	17.1
GEMEO/IPAM	6 Oct 2005	800	48	42	4	—	6	6
2001 local election	16 Dec 2001	—	64.7; 5	27.3; 2	2.4; 0	2.3; 0	3.3	37.4

=== Coimbra ===
Polling firm/Link	Fieldwork date	Sample size	PSD CDS PPM	PS	CDU	BE	O	Lead
2005 local election	9 Oct 2005	—	44.8; 6	29.7; 4	13.5; 1	5.2; 0	6.8; 0	15.1
GEMEO/IPAM	6–8 Sep 2005	800	54	26	11	4	5	28
GEMEO/IPAM	13–15 Jul 2005	400	61	22	11	5	1	39
2001 local election	16 Dec 2001	—	50.8; 6	29.8; 4	12.7; 1	1.8; 0	4.9; 0	21.0

=== Covilhã ===
Polling firm/Link	Fieldwork date	Sample size	PSD	PS	CDU	CDS	BE	O	Lead
2005 local election	9 Oct 2005	—	58.9; 5	24.7; 2	7.9; 0	1.6; 0	2.0; 0	4.9; 0	34.2
REGIPOM	16–18 Aug 2005	123	70	6	—	—	—	24	64
2001 local election	16 Dec 2001	—	66.0; 6	18.7; 1	8.6; 0	2.6; 0	—	4.1	47.3

=== Estarreja ===
Polling firm/Link	Fieldwork date	Sample size	PSD CDS	PS	CDU	O	Lead
2005 local election	9 Oct 2005	—	64.7; 5	26.5; 2	4.6; 0	4.2	38.2
GEMEO/IPAM	14–16 Sep 2005	500	61	30	5	4	31
2001 local election	16 Dec 2001	—	47.4; 4	44.1; 3	5.0; 0	3.6; 0	3.3

=== Faro ===
Exit poll

Polling firm/Link	Fieldwork date	Sample size	PSD	PS	CDU	CDS	BE	O	Lead
2005 local election	9 Oct 2005	—	38.3; 3	41.1; 4	8.9; 0	1.4; 0	4.6; 0	5.6; 0	2.8
UCP	9 Oct 2005	?	37–42	40–45	7–9	1–2	4–6	–	3
Intercampus	1–5 Oct 2005	800	34.0	43.9	8.0	2.8	6.0	5.3	9.9
REGIPOM	30 Sep–2 Oct 2005	450	31.1	39.8	8.4	1.6	7.3	11.8	8.7
UCP	24–25 Sep 2005	1,160	34	43	9	—	8	6	9
Eurosondagem	13–14 Sep 2005	711	42.7	41.9	7.3	1.5	3.4	3.2	0.8
Aximage	1–2 Aug 2005	500	28.3	39.6	7.8	1.7	4.2	18.4	11.3
Eurosondagem	4–6 Apr 2005	1,010	37.5	36.5	4.9	1.5	4.8	14.8	1.0
2001 local election	16 Dec 2001	—	42.5; 4	39.0; 3	10.1; 0	2.8; 0	1.6; 0	4.0	3.5

=== Felgueiras ===
Exit poll

Polling firm/Link	Fieldwork date	Sample size	PS	PSD	CDS	CDU	BE	FF	O	Lead
2005 local election	9 Oct 2005	—	15.4; 1	29.1; 2	1.9; 0	1.5; 0	1.0; 0	47.9; 4	3.2	18.8
UCP	9 Oct 2005	?	10–12	25–28	1.5–2.5	0–2	0–2	53–58	–	28–30
Intercampus	1–5 Oct 2005	816	20.1	28.4	1.8	0.9	1.0	46.8	1.1	18.4
Marktest	30 Sep–1 Oct 2005	404	23.3	25.0	1.0	1.4	3.0	44.6	1.7	19.6
Intercampus	21 Sep 2005	330	27	18	2	4	4	38	7	11
Eurosondagem	13–14 Sep 2005	757	35.2	24.2	1.4	2.4	1.4	33.3	2.1	1.9
2001 local election	16 Dec 2001	—	52.7; 4	39.1; 3	3.2; 0	2.5; 0	—	—	2.5	13.6

=== Funchal ===
Polling firm/Link	Fieldwork date	Sample size	PSD	PS	CDS	CDU	BE	O	Lead
2005 local election	9 Oct 2005	—	50.2; 6	25.2; 3	7.8; 1	8.3; 1	5.0; 0	3.5	25.0
Eurosondagem	21–22 Apr 2005	525	48.3	34.1	4.1	5.4	5.7	2.4	14.2
2001 local election	16 Dec 2001	—	55.7; 6	27.3; 3		6.4; 0	—	10.6; 0	28.4

=== Gondomar ===
Exit poll

Polling firm/Link	Fieldwork date	Sample size	PSD CDS	PS	CDU	BE	VL	O	Lead
2005 local election	9 Oct 2005	—	7.2; 1	18.7; 2	7.1; 0	3.4; 0	57.5; 8	6.1; 0	38.8
UCP	9 Oct 2005	?	7–9	19–22	5–7	2–4	54–60	–	35–38
REGIPOM	6 Oct 2005	450	6.9	12.9	—	—	64.2	16.0	51.3
Intercampus	1–5 Oct 2005	814	15.0	23.0	6.5	2.1	53.9	2.4	30.9
Marktest	30 Sep–1 Oct 2005	402	9.0	17.0	2.1	1.7	59.4	10.8	42.4
UCP	24–25 Sep 2005	1,187	14	22	6	—	50	4	28
Eurosondagem	27–28 Jul 2005	1,021	8.8	22.0	6.2	2.1	44.5	16.4	22.5
2001 local election	16 Dec 2001	—	61.9; 7	25.4; 3	7.7; 1	1.1; 0	—	4.0	36.5

=== Guarda ===
Polling firm/Link	Fieldwork date	Sample size	PS	PSD	CDS	CDU	BE	O	Lead
2005 local election	9 Oct 2005	—	52.5; 4	33.8; 3	4.6; 0	1.8; 0	2.0; 0	5.3; 0	18.7
REGIPOM	22 Sep 2005	300	26.7	26.0	2.0	1.3	0.7	43.3	0.7
REGIPOM	10–12 Aug 2005	151	11	4	2	—	—	83	7
2001 local election	16 Dec 2001	—	47.7; 4	42.5; 3	3.0; 0	2.0; 0	—	4.9; 0	5.2

=== Ílhavo ===
Polling firm/Link	Fieldwork date	Sample size	PSD	PS	CDU	CDS	O	Lead
2005 local election	9 Oct 2005	—	60.9; 5	26.4; 2	4.7; 0	4.0; 0	4.0	34.5
GEMEO/IPAM	27–28 Apr 2005	300	63	24	7	3	3	39
2001 local election	16 Dec 2001	—	65.7; 6	19.9; 1	6.7; 0	4.3; 0	3.4	45.8

=== Leiria ===
Polling firm/Link	Fieldwork date	Sample size	PSD	PS	CDS	CDU	BE	O	Lead
2005 local election	9 Oct 2005	—	42.6; 4	35.5; 4	9.3; 1	2.5; 0	3.4; 0	6.7	7.1
Aximage	4–8 Sep 2005	555	39.4	33.5	7.5	3.6	1.5	14.5	5.9
IPOM	20–21 Jun 2005	599	56.0	31.1	4.4	5.8	—	2.7	24.9
2001 local election	16 Dec 2001	—	52.0; 5	20.9; 2	9.7; 1	2.0; 0	—	14.4; 1	31.1

=== Lisbon ===
Exit poll

Polling firm/Link	Fieldwork date	Sample size	PSD	PS	CDU	CDS	BE	O	Lead
2005 local election	9 Oct 2005	—	42.4; 8	26.6; 5	11.4; 2	5.9; 1	7.9; 1	5.8; 0	15.8
UCP	9 Oct 2005	?	40–44	26–30	10–13	5–7	8–10	–	14
Eurosondagem	2–5 Oct 2005	1,569	41.4	30.5	10.1	5.5	8.5	4.0	10.9
Intercampus	1–5 Oct 2005	1,001	34.3	34.7	12.0	4.9	6.9	7.2	0.4
Aximage	3–4 Oct 2005	500	38.5	30.2	8.0	5.6	7.7	10.0	8.3
UCP	1–2 Oct 2005	2,410	36	31	10	7	10	6	5
Marktest	1 Oct 2005	503	38.2	27.7	9.2	8.0	9.2	8.3	10.5
Aximage	24–27 Sep 2005	500	39.9	25.7	6.8	4.4	5.7	17.5	14.2
UCP	7–11 Jul 2005	989	36	41	6	3	8	5	5
Eurosondagem	20–22 Jun 2005	1,525	36.4	29.6	7.8	4.1	7.5	14.6	6.8
Aximage	22–23 Mar 2005	600	47.2	46.6	—	—	—	6.2	0.6
Eurosondagem	15–16 Mar 2005	1,048	41	44	—	—	—	15	3
2001 local election	16 Dec 2001	—	42.0; 8	41.7; 8		7.6; 1	3.8; 0	5.0; 0	0.3

=== Loulé ===
Polling firm/Link	Fieldwork date	Sample size	PSD	PS	CDS	BE	CDU	O	Lead
2005 local election	9 Oct 2005	—	51.4; 4	37.4; 3	1.6; 0	2.7; 0	2.2; 0	4.7	14.0
REGIPOM	30 Sep–2 Oct 2005	450	38.9	34.4	3.3	0.4	0.4	22.6	4.5
2001 local election	16 Dec 2001	—	46.8; 4	44.0; 3	2.3; 0	1.6; 0	1.5; 0	3.8	2.8

=== Machico ===
Polling firm/Link	Fieldwork date	Sample size	PSD	PS	CDS	CDU	BE	O	Lead
2005 local election	9 Oct 2005	—	57.6; 4	37.1; 3	0.9; 0	1.0; 0	0.9; 0	2.5	20.5
Eurosondagem	28–29 Sep 2005	505	44.5	35.4	2.4	1.0	4.3	12.4	9.1
2001 local election	16 Dec 2001	—	52.6; 4	43.3; 3	0.9; 0	0.6; 0	—	2.6; 0	9.3

=== Maia ===
Polling firm/Link	Fieldwork date	Sample size	PSD CDS	PS	CDU	BE	O	Lead
2005 local election	9 Oct 2005	—	52.5; 6	29.2; 3	5.6; 0	5.4; 0	7.3; 0	23.3
IPOM	1–2 Jun 2005	706	46.9	23.9	—	—	29.2	23.0
2001 local election	16 Dec 2001	—	56.3; 6	29.7; 3	5.4; 0	1.7; 0	6.9; 0	26.6

=== Marinha Grande ===
Polling firm/Link	Fieldwork date	Sample size	PS	CDU	PSD	CDS	BE	O	Lead
2005 local election	9 Oct 2005	—	36.4; 3	38.7; 3	11.5; 1	1.8; 0	6.1; 0	5.5	2.3
Eurosondagem	14–16 Jun 2005	720	41.7	29.8	15.3	2.5	7.3	3.4	11.9
2001 local election	16 Dec 2001	—	38.2; 3	36.1; 3	15.3; 1	2.7; 0	2.5; 0	5.2	2.1

=== Matosinhos ===
Polling firm/Link	Fieldwork date	Sample size	PS	PSD CDS	CDU	BE	O	Lead
2005 local election	9 Oct 2005	—	47.3; 6	30.9; 4	8.6; 1	7.0; 0	6.2; 0	16.4
Marktest	1 Oct 2005	407	50.9	24.4	5.2	7.0	12.5	26.5
2001 local election	16 Dec 2001	—	54.1; 6	31.5; 4	7.7; 1	2.5; 0	4.2	22.6

=== Murtosa ===
Polling firm/Link	Fieldwork date	Sample size	PSD	PS	CDU	CDS	O	Lead
2005 local election	9 Oct 2005	—	63.5; 4	29.8; 1	0.8; 0	1.8; 0	4.1	33.7
GEMEO/IPAM	19–21 Sep 2005	400	61	27	4	4	3	34
2001 local election	16 Dec 2001	—	63.6; 4	26.5; 1	3.6; 0	1.5; 0	4.8	37.1

=== Oeiras ===
Exit poll

Polling firm/Link	Fieldwork date	Sample size	PSD	PS	CDU	CDS	BE	IM	O	Lead
2005 local election	9 Oct 2005	—	30.5; 4	15.6; 2	7.9; 1	1.4; 0	4.8; 0	34.1; 4	5.7; 0	3.6
UCP	9 Oct 2005	?	28–32	14–17	6–8	1–2	4–6	36–40	–	8
Intercampus	1–5 Oct 2005	806	26.5	18.2	6.2	2.1	5.6	37.2	4.2	10.7
Marktest	30 Sep–1 Oct 2005	400	33.5	8.9	4.6	2.1	5.0	35.9	10.0	2.4
UCP	24–25 Sep 2005	1,052	33	16	4	—	6	34	7	1
Eurosondagem	20–21 Sep 2005	1,020	31.2	17.9	5.7	1.4	3.6	36.9	3.3	5.7
Eurosondagem	28–29 Jun 2005	1,025	24.6	18.6	5.9	—	3.9	27.9	19.1	3.3
2001 local election	16 Dec 2001	—	55.0; 7	23.7; 3	10.0; 1	3.5; 0	2.9; 0	—	4.9; 0	31.3

=== Ovar ===
Polling firm/Link	Fieldwork date	Sample size	PS	PSD	CDU	CDS	BE	IND	O	Lead
2005 local election	9 Oct 2005	—	41.2; 4	35.0; 3	5.7; 0	2.2; 0	4.4; 0	6.4; 0	5.1	6.2
GEMEO/IPAM	6–7 Jul 2005	300	22.4	13.8	1.6	1.6	2.0	—	58.6	8.6
2001 local election	16 Dec 2001	—	44.7; 4	35.0; 3	6.3; 0	5.5; 0	3.3; 0	—	5.2	9.7

=== Ponta do Sol ===
Polling firm/Link	Fieldwork date	Sample size	PSD	PS	CDS	CDU	BE	O	Lead
2005 local election	9 Oct 2005	—	48.6; 3	46.1; 2	2.3; 0	0.6; 0	0.7; 0	1.7	2.5
Eurosondagem	21–22 Sep 2005	320	42.5	41.6	4.7	1.2	2.2	7.8	0.9
2001 local election	16 Dec 2001	—	58.4; 2	37.5; 2		—	—	4.1; 0	20.9

=== Portimão ===
Polling firm/Link	Fieldwork date	Sample size	PS	PSD CDS PPM MPT	CDU	BE	IND	O	Lead
2005 local election	9 Oct 2005	—	42.5; 4	28.7; 2	10.7; 1	7.5; 0	5.1; 0	5.5	13.8
REGIPOM	30 Sep–2 Oct 2005	450	46.7	20.9	2.7	3.3	2.7	23.8	25.8
2001 local election	16 Dec 2001	—	50.8; 4	36.0; 2	7.5; 1	1.4; 0	—	4.3	14.8

=== Porto ===
Exit poll

Polling firm/Link	Fieldwork date	Sample size	PSD CDS	PS	CDU	BE	O	Lead
2005 local election	9 Oct 2005	—	46.2; 7	36.1; 5	9.0; 1	4.2; 0	4.5; 0	10.1
UCP	9 Oct 2005	?	43–48	36–40	7–10	3–5	–	7–8
Eurosondagem	2–5 Oct 2005	1,057	41.2	39.1	9.1	5.9	4.7	2.1
Intercampus	1–5 Oct 2005	1,000	37.5	39.3	10.2	6.6	6.4	1.8
UCP	1–2 Oct 2005	2,392	43	36	7	6	7	7
Marktest	1 Oct 2005	401	49.1	29.5	8.2	6.0	7.1	19.6
UCP	4–6 Jul 2005	910	55	29	9	3	4	26
IPOM	16–17 Mar 2005	598	44.3	35.3	—	—	20.4	9.0
Eurosondagem	13–14 Mar 2005	757	46	40	—	—	14	6
2001 local election	16 Dec 2001	—	42.7; 6	38.5; 6	10.5; 1	2.6; 0	5.7; 0	4.2

=== Santa Cruz ===
Polling firm/Link	Fieldwork date	Sample size	PSD	PS	CDS	CDU	BE	O	Lead
2005 local election	9 Oct 2005	—	46.8; 4	40.4; 3	3.4; 0	3.2; 0	2.9; 0	3.3	6.4
Eurosondagem	26–27 Sep 2005	505	43.9	29.3	9.9	3.0	3.0	10.9	14.6
2001 local election	16 Dec 2001	—	59.0; 5	32.4; 2		2.8; 0	—	5.8; 0	26.6

=== Santa Maria da Feira ===
Polling firm/Link	Fieldwork date	Sample size	PSD	PS	CDS	CDU	BE	O	Lead
2005 local election	9 Oct 2005	—	49.0; 6	39.5; 5	3.1; 0	2.6; 0	2.0; 0	3.8	9.5
GEMEO/IPAM	11–12 Jul 2005	400	22	19	1	1	2	55	3
2001 local election	16 Dec 2001	—	50.8; 7	33.0; 4	5.5; 0	2.3; 0	0.7; 0	7.7; 0	17.8

=== Santarém ===
Polling firm/Link	Fieldwork date	Sample size	PS	PSD	CDU	CDS	BE	O	Lead
2005 local election	9 Oct 2005	—	37.8; 4	41.4; 4	12.2; 1	2.3; 0	2.5; 0	3.8	3.6
Intercampus	1–11 Jul 2005	600	30.2	24.5	10.5	0.8	—	34.0	5.7
IPOM	3 Jul 2005	479	25.1	33.8	12.3	2.1	3.8	22.9	8.7
2001 local election	16 Dec 2001	—	42.6; 4	30.8; 3	17.3; 2	3.0; 0	1.7; 0	4.6	11.8

=== São João da Madeira ===
Polling firm/Link	Fieldwork date	Sample size	PSD	CDS	PS	CDU	BE	O	Lead
2005 local election	9 Oct 2005	—	56.2; 5	12.7; 1	19.8; 1	5.0; 0	2.6; 0	3.7	36.4
GEMEO/IPAM	13–15 Jun 2005	300	57	17	15	8	—	3	40
2001 local election	16 Dec 2001	—	44.6; 4	25.3; 2	20.1; 1	5.6; 0	0.6; 0	3.8; 0	19.3

=== São Vicente ===
Polling firm/Link	Fieldwork date	Sample size	PSD	PS	CDS	CDU	BE	O	Lead
2005 local election	9 Oct 2005	—	52.1; 3	40.8; 2	2.2; 0	0.8; 0	0.6; 0	3.5	11.3
Eurosondagem	28 Sep 2005	325	48.3	34.1	2.2	1.8	2.8	10.8	14.2
2001 local election	16 Dec 2001	—	64.7; 4	25.2; 1		1.7; 0	—	8.4; 0	39.5

=== Sintra ===
Exit poll

Polling firm/Link	Fieldwork date	Sample size	PSD CDS PPM MPT	PS	CDU	BE	O	Lead
2005 local election	9 Oct 2005	—	43.5; 6	30.9; 4	12.4; 1	6.5; 0	6.7; 0	12.6
UCP	9 Oct 2005	?	43–47	29–33	11–14	6–8	–	14
Intercampus	1–5 Oct 2005	802	38.9	36.8	9.9	9.8	4.6	2.1
UCP	1–2 Oct 2005	1,103	36	35	13	10	4	1
Eurosondagem	19–20 Sep 2005	1,025	42.1	38.1	10.2	5.1	4.5	4.0
Aximage	11–12 Jul 2005	601	37.8	38.3	11.7	4.8	7.4	0.5
2001 local election	16 Dec 2001	—	39.2; 5	36.4; 4	15.8; 2	2.7; 0	5.9	2.8

=== Torres Novas ===
Polling firm/Link	Fieldwork date	Sample size	PS	PSD	CDU	CDS	BE	O	Lead
2005 local election	9 Oct 2005	—	52.7; 5	20.8; 1	15.2; 1	1.6; 0	4.5; 0	5.2	31.9
REGIPOM	17–21 Sep 2005	300	50.0	11.3	10.0	0.7	2.0	26.0	38.7
2001 local election	16 Dec 2001	—	47.6; 4	24.5; 2	17.0; 1	3.3; 0	2.9; 0	4.7	23.1

=== Torres Vedras ===
Polling firm/Link	Fieldwork date	Sample size	PS	PSD	CDU	CDS	O	Lead
2005 local election	9 Oct 2005	—	49.2; 5	35.6; 3	9.0; 1	2.0; 0	4.2	13.6
Euroexpansão	9–12 Sep 2005	601	41.7	22.3	2.3	1.7	32.0	19.4
2001 local election	16 Dec 2001	—	41.7; 4	41.5; 4	10.2; 1	3.1; 0	3.5	0.2

=== Vila Real de Santo António ===
Polling firm/Link	Fieldwork date	Sample size	PS	CDU	PSD	CDS	BE	O	Lead
2005 local election	9 Oct 2005	—	35.3; 3	14.8; 1	44.1; 3	0.6; 0	2.2; 0	3.0	8.8
Eurosondagem	17–18 Jul 2005	510	45.0	16.7	35.0	—	1.1	2.2	10.0
2001 local election	16 Dec 2001	—	37.0; 2	31.3; 2	25.4; 2	2.5; 0	0.8; 0	3.0	5.7

=== Vagos ===
Polling firm/Link	Fieldwork date	Sample size	PSD	CDS	PS	CDU	O	Lead
2005 local election	9 Oct 2005	—	63.6; 6	21.0; 1	9.7; 0	1.4; 0	4.3	42.6
GEMEO/IPAM	20–22 Jul 2005	400	39	6	5	—	50	33
2001 local election	16 Dec 2001	—	49.0; 4	42.6; 3	5.0; 0	0.5; 0	2.9	6.4
