= Glória do Ribatejo =

Former civil parish in Alentejo, Portugal

- Civil parish
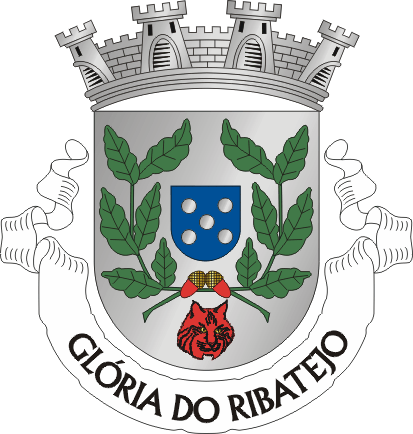
- Coat of arms

- Location in Portugal
- Coordinates: 39°03′N 8°42′W
- Country: Portugal
- Region: Oeste e Vale do Tejo
- Intermunic. comm.: Lezíria do Tejo
- District: Santarém
- Municipality: Salvaterra de Magos
- Disbanded: 2013

Area
  - Total: 55.03 km^{2} (21.25 sq mi)

Population
  - Total: 3,427
  - Density: 62/km^{2} (160/sq mi)
- Time zone: UTC+00:00 (WET)
  - Summer (DST): UTC+01:00 (WEST)

Glória do Ribatejo is a former civil parish in the municipality of Salvaterra de Magos, Portugal. In 2013, the parish merged into the new parish Glória do Ribatejo e Granho. It has a total area of 55.03 km², and a total population of 3,427 inhabitants according to the 2001 census.

For decades during the Cold War and after the fall of the Soviet Union, under the administration of Oliveira Salazar and his successors, it was the site of RARET (Portuguese RAdio de RETransmissão (Retransmission Radio)), a United States installation that broadcast programs of Radio Free Europe via shortwave to nations of Eastern Europe behind the Iron Curtain, including the Soviet Union (and later Russia). It operated from 1951 to 1996, and was the only one to be operated outside Germany. After it was closed, the installation was abandoned.

The town is the setting for Glória, a 2021 historical spy thriller that is the first Netflix production made in Portugal.
