= Radio Farda =

US-funded Persian language radio

Coordinates: 50°4′44″N 14°28′43″E

- راديو فردا
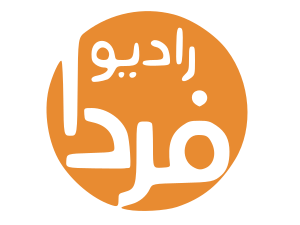
- Abbreviation: RF
- Formation: December 2002
- Headquarters: Prague Broadcast Center, Prague, Czech Republic
- Official language: Persian
- President: Kambiz Fattahi
- Parent organization: Radio Free Europe/Radio Liberty
- Website: radiofarda.com

Radio Farda (Persian: راديو فردا, lit. 'Radio Tomorrow') is the Iranian branch of the U.S. government-funded Radio Free Europe/Radio Liberty (RFE/RL) external broadcast service for providing "factual, objective and professional journalism" to its audiences. It broadcasts 24 hours a day in the Persian language from its headquarters in the district Hagibor of Prague, Czech Republic.

Radio Farda first aired in December 2002. It broadcasts news on topics such as political, cultural, social, and art with an emphasis on Iran. Radio Farda's broadcasts have been continually blocked by Iranian authorities over the history of its programming.

On March 15, 2025, the United States Agency for Global Media terminated grants to Radio Free Europe/Radio Liberty and its subsidiaries following a directive from the Trump Administration.

Iranian authorities classified various Persian-language media outlets operating outside the country including Radio Farda as part of their “military target bank” during the 2026 Iran war.

== History ==
Radio Farda was established in 2003 as a joint effort of RFE/RL and Voice of America (VOA). In 2007, the Broadcasting Board of Governors (BBG) decided to consolidate all of Radio Farda's operations under RFE/RL. Then in July 2008, RFE/RL assumed sole responsibility for all Radio Farda programming.

In 2008, Jay Solomon of The Wall Street Journal published a feature story on the challenges Radio Farda faced from an increasingly repressive Iranian regime as well as those in Washington who sought a tougher line on Iran. A few challenges he highlighted were Radio Farda journalists being unjustly convicted of crimes against the state, and millions of dollars spent on jamming Radio Farda broadcasts. He also went into detail about the fine line Radio Farda must walk to present itself as objective and accurate news source to its audience even though it is congressionally funded through the Broadcasting Board of Governors.

An Iranian-American journalist working for Radio Farda, Parnaz Azima, was banned from leaving Iran after her trip to the country. She had entered Iran to visit her ailing mother. She was jailed in May 2007 and released in August. Her passport was returned to her on a $550,000 bail.

According to Iason Athanasiadis of The Christian Science Monitor, the Prague-headquartered Radio Farda was at first "tolerated" by the Islamic Republic, unlike "the Washington-based Voice of America", and "regularly interviewed Iranian politicians". However, on February 7, 2010, the public relations office of the Ministry of Intelligence announced the arrest of seven journalists described as "elements of a counter-revolutionary Zionist satellite station" and in the "official pay" of US intelligence organizations. They were later identified as working for Radio Farda. Radio Farda's director, Armand Mostofi, told CNN it has no employees inside Iran.

== Awards ==
Radio Farda web editor Fred Petrossians won a media award from Think Social for an internet-based project he co-founded that seeks to spread awareness of bloggers' rights in Iran and other countries with unfree media.

Iranian-born Radio Farda journalist Ahmad Rafat, now a reporter based in Italy, has been honored for his more than 30 years of work advocating press freedom and exposing human rights abuses. The 2008 Ilaria Alpi award was presented by the Italian chapter of Reporters Without Borders to Rafat at a June 7 ceremony in Riccione, Italy.

== See also ==
- International Broadcasting Bureau
- IRIB World Service
- Press TV
