= António Roquete =

António Roquete may refer to:

- António Roquete (footballer)
- António Roquete (judoka)
