= Radio Free Europe/Radio Liberty =

US-funded international media outlet

- Logo

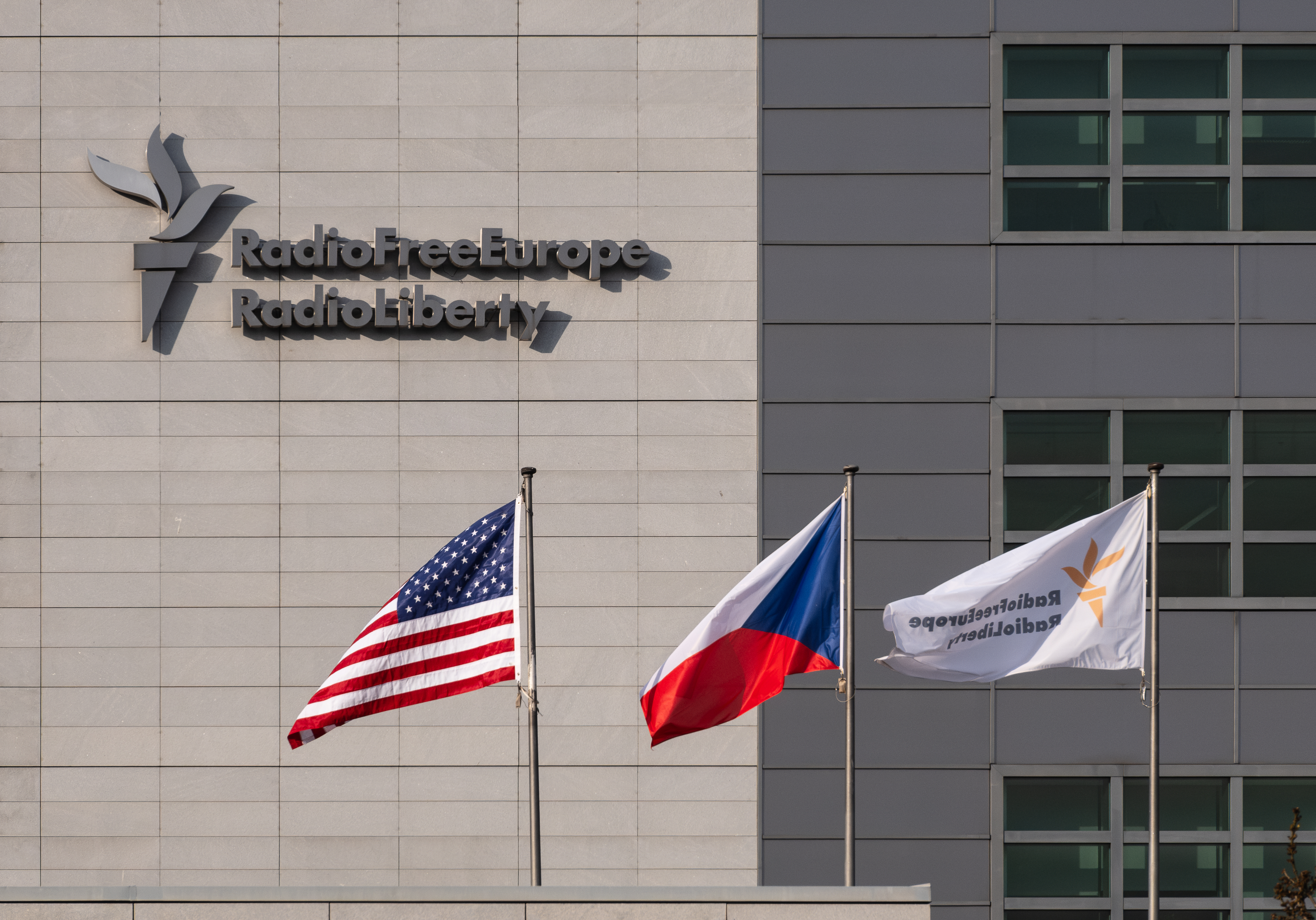
- Headquarters in Prague-Hagibor
- Abbreviation: RFE/RL
- Formation: 1949 (Radio Free Europe), 1953 (Radio Liberty), 1976 (merger)
- Type: 501(c)(3) organization
- Tax ID no.: 52-1068522
- Purpose: Broadcast Media
- Headquarters: Prague Broadcast Center; 50°4′44″N 14°28′43″E
- Location: Prague, Czechia
- Official language: English; Programs are also available in Albanian, Armenian, Azerbaijani, Bashkir, Bosnian, Belarusian, Bulgarian, Chechen, Crimean Tatar, Dari, Georgian, Kazakh, Kyrgyz, Macedonian, Montenegrin, Pashto, Persian, Romanian, Russian, Serbian, Tajik, Tatar, Turkmen, Ukrainian, Uzbek; In the past also Polish, Czech, Slovak, Lithuanian, Latvian, Estonian and various other languages; see this list
- Owner: U.S. Agency for Global Media
- President: Stephen Capus
- Vice President and Head of News: Nicola Careem
- General Counsel/Secretary: Benjamin Herman
- Budget: $124,300,000 (Fiscal year 2021)
- Staff: >1700
- Website: RFERL.org; svoboda.org; rferlo2zxgv23tct66v45s5mecftol5vod3hf4rqbipfp46fqu2q56ad.onion ^{(Accessing link help)}

Radio Free Europe/Radio Liberty (Note: Known as Radio Svoboda (Ukrainian: Радіо Свобода; Russian: Радио Свобода) in its Ukrainian- and Russian-language editions.) (RFE/RL) is an American state-funded media organization broadcasting news and analyses in 27 languages to 23 countries across Eastern Europe, Central Asia, the Caucasus, and the Middle East. Headquartered in Prague since 1995, RFE/RL operates 21 local bureaus with over 500 core staff.

Founded during the Cold War, RFE began in 1949 targeting Soviet satellite states, while RL, established in 1951, focused on the Soviet Union. Initially funded covertly by the CIA until 1972, the two merged in 1976. RFE/RL was headquartered in Munich from 1949 to 1995, with additional broadcasts from Portugal's Glória do Ribatejo until 1996. Soviet authorities jammed their signals, and communist regimes often infiltrated their operations.

RFE/RL is a private 501(c)(3) corporation supervised by the United States Agency for Global Media, which oversees all government-supported international broadcasting. Since the Revolutions of 1989 and the Soviet Union's dissolution, the organization's European presence has been reduced.

On 15 March 2025, the United States Agency for Global Media terminated grants to RFE/RL and Radio Free Asia following a directive from the Trump administration. On 18 March, RFE/RL sued USAGM and two USAGM officials to block the grant termination.

The organization has been described by researchers as a means of spreading American propaganda and the interests of the United States. Since 2025, State Media Monitor has classified USAGM and its outlets, including RFE/RL, as state-controlled media, characterized as "media in which the government retains a major role [...] controlling their management and closely supervising their editorial agenda".

== Early history ==
=== Radio Free Europe ===
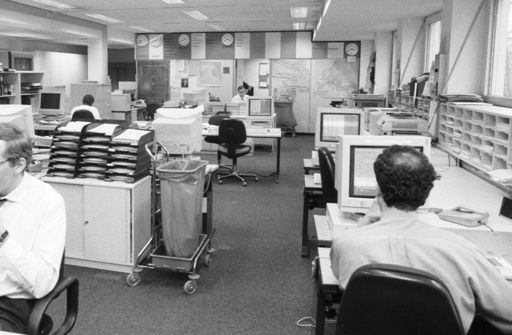
Radio Free Europe/ Radio Liberty Newsroom in Munich, 1994

Radio Free Europe was created and grew in its early years through the efforts of the National Committee for a Free Europe (NCFE), an anti-communist CIA front organization that was formed by Allen Dulles in New York City in 1949. RFE/RL received funds covertly from the CIA until 1972. During RFE's earliest years of existence, the CIA and U.S. Department of State issued broad policy directives, and a system evolved where broadcast policy was determined through negotiation between them and RFE staff.

Radio Free Europe received widespread public support from Eisenhower's "Crusade for Freedom" campaign. In 1950, over 16 million Americans signed Eisenhower's "Freedom Scrolls" on a publicity trip to more than 20 U.S. cities and contributed $1,317,000 to the expansion of RFE.

Writer Sig Mickelson said that the NCFE's mission was to support refugees and provide them with a useful outlet for their opinions and creativity while increasing exposure to the modern world. The NCFE divided its program into three parts: exile relations, radio, and American contacts.

The United States funded a long list of projects to counter the "Communist appeal" among intellectuals in Europe and the developing world. RFE was developed out of a belief that the Cold War would eventually be fought by political rather than military means. American policymakers such as George Kennan and John Foster Dulles acknowledged that the Cold War was essentially a war of ideas. The implementation of surrogate radio stations was a key part of the greater psychological war effort.

RFE was modeled after Radio in the American Sector (RIAS) a U.S. government-sponsored radio service initially intended for Germans living in the American sector of Berlin. According to Arch Puddington, a former bureau manager for RFE/RL, it was also widely listened to by East Germans. Staffed almost entirely by Germans with minimal U.S. supervision, the station provided free media to German listeners.

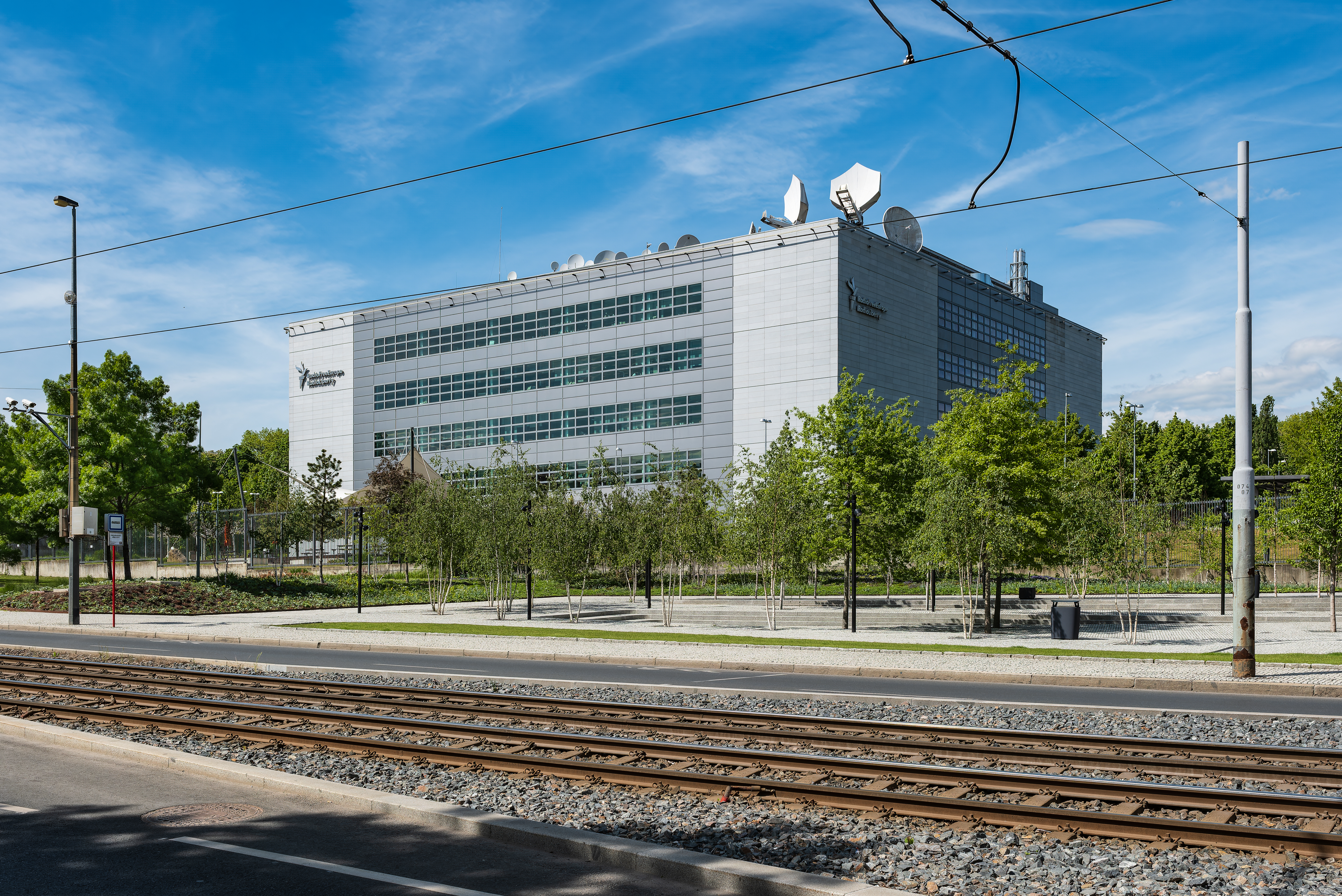
Radio Free Europe/Radio Liberty Building in Prague-Hagibor, 2025

In January 1950, the NCFE obtained a transmitter base at Lampertheim, West Germany, and on 4 July of the same year RFE completed its first broadcast aimed at Czechoslovakia. In late 1950, RFE began to assemble a full-fledged foreign broadcast staff, becoming more than a "mouthpiece for exiles". Teams of journalists were hired for each language service, and an elaborate system of intelligence gathering provided up-to-date broadcast material. Most of this material came from a network of well-connected émigrés and interviews with travelers and defectors. RFE did not use paid agents inside the Iron Curtain and based its bureaus in regions popular with exiles. RFE also extensively monitored Communist bloc publications and radio services, creating a body of information that would later serve as a resource for organizations across the world.

In addition to its regular broadcasts, RFE spread broadcasts through a series of operations that distributed leaflets via meteorological balloons; one such operation, Prospero, sent messages to Czechoslovakia. From October 1951 to November 1956, the skies of Central Europe were filled with more than 350,000 balloons carrying over 300 million leaflets, posters, books, and other printed matter. The nature of the leaflets varied, and according to Arch Puddington included messages of support and encouragement "to citizens suffering under communist oppression", "satirical criticisms of communist regimes and leaders", information about dissident movements and human rights campaigns, and messages expressing the solidarity of the American people with the residents of Eastern European nations. Puddington stated that "the project served as a publicity tool to solidify RFE's reputation as an unbiased broadcaster".

=== Radio Liberty ===
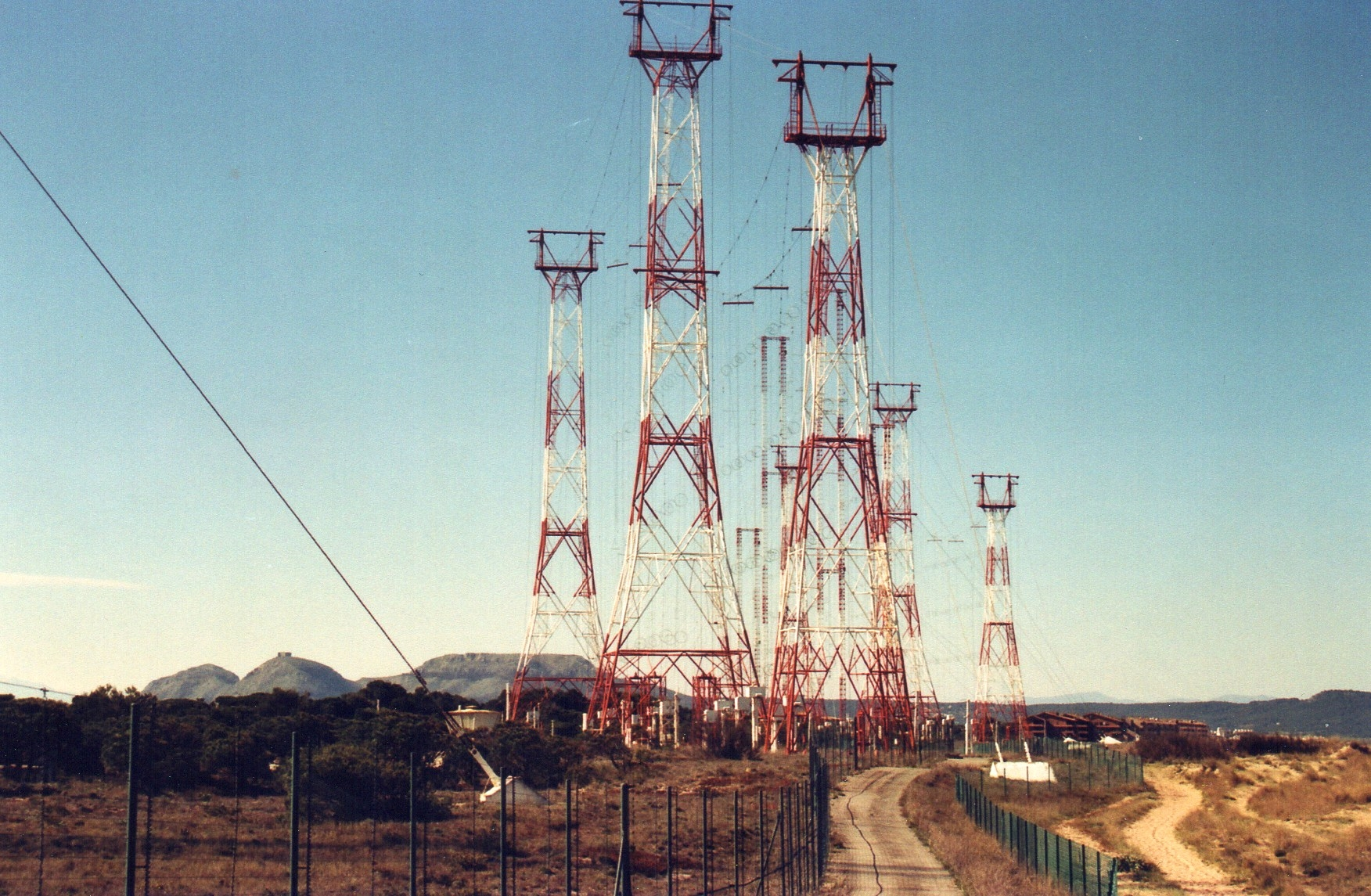
Antennas of RFE's/RL's transmission facilities on the beach of Pals (Catalonia, Spain) in 2005

Whereas Radio Free Europe broadcast to Soviet satellite countries, Radio Liberty broadcast to the Soviet Union. Radio Liberty was formed by American Committee for the Liberation of the Peoples of Russia (Amcomlib) in 1951. Originally named Radio Liberation from Bolshevism, the station was renamed Radio Liberation in 1956, and received its present name, Radio Liberty, after a policy statement emphasizing "liberalization" rather than "liberation".

Radio Liberty began broadcasting from Lampertheim on 1 March 1953, gaining a substantial audience when it covered the death of Joseph Stalin four days later. In order to better serve a greater geographic area, RFE supplemented its shortwave transmissions from Lampertheim with broadcasts from a transmitter base at Glória, Portugal in 1951. It also had a base at Oberwiesenfeld Airport on the outskirts of Munich, employing several former Nazi agents who had been involved in the Ostministerium under Gerhard von Mende during World War II. In 1955, Radio Liberty began broadcasting programs to Russia's eastern provinces from shortwave transmitters located on Taiwan. In 1959, Radio Liberty commenced broadcasts from a base at Platja de Pals, Spain.

Radio Liberty expanded its audience by broadcasting programs in languages other than Russian. By March 1954, Radio Liberty was broadcasting six to seven hours daily in eleven languages. By December 1954, Radio Liberty was broadcasting in 17 languages including Ukrainian, Belarusian, Kazakh, Kyrgyz, Tajik, Turkmen, Uzbek, Tatar, Bashkir, Armenian, Azerbaijani, Georgian, and other languages of the Caucasus and Central Asia.

=== List of languages ===
Service	Language	Target audience	from	to	Website	Notes
Czechoslovak	Czech	Czech inhabited lands of Czechoslovak Republic (1950–1960); Czech inhabited lands of Czechoslovak Socialist Republic (1960–1969) (Czech Socialist Republic) Czech SR (1969–1990); Czech Republic (1990–1993)	4 July 1950	1 January 1993	—	the Czech desk split from Czechoslovak Service as Czech Service (1993–1995) operated as RSE Inc. (1995–2002)
Czechoslovak	Slovak	Slovak inhabited lands of Czechoslovak Republic (1950–1960); Slovak inhabited lands of Czechoslovak Socialist Republic (1960–1969) (Slovak Socialist Republic) Slovak SR (1969–1990); Slovakia (1990–1993)	4 July 1950	4 January 1993	—	the Slovak desk split from Czechoslovak Service as Slovak Service (1993–2004)
Romanian	Romanian	Romanian People's Republic (1950–1965); Socialist Republic of Romania (1965–1989); Romania (1989–2008, 2019–2026)	14 July 1950; 14 January 2019	1 August 2008; 31 March 2026	Radio Europa Liberă	also covered (Ukrainian Soviet Socialist Republic) Chernivtsi Oblast (1950–1953), (Ukrainian Soviet Socialist Republic) Izmail Oblast (1950–1953), (Moldavian Soviet Socialist Republic) Moldavian SSR (1950–1953, 1990–1991) and Republic of Moldova (1991–1998) merged into Moldovan Service in 2008 split from Moldovan Service in 2019
Hungarian	Hungarian	Hungarian People's Republic (1950–1989); Hungary (1989–1993, 2020–2025)	4 August 1950; 8 September 2020	31 October 1993; 21 November 2025	Szabad Európa	
Polish	Polish	Polish People's Republic (1950–1989); Poland (1990–1994)	4 August 1950	31 December 1994	—	operated as RWE Inc. (1995–1997)
Bulgarian	Bulgarian	(People's Republic of Bulgaria) Bulgarian People's Republic (1950–1989); Bulgaria (1989–2004, 2019–2026)	11 August 1950; 21 January 2019	31 January 2004; 31 March 2026	Свободна Европа	
Albanian	Albanian	(People's Socialist Republic of Albania) Albanian People's Republic	1 June 1951	1952	—	
Russian	Russian	(Russian Soviet Federative Socialist Republic) Russian SFSR (1953–1991); Russia (1991–2022)	1 March 1953	present	Радио Свобода	as Radio Liberty also covered Soviet Armed Forces deployed in Eastern Europe and in Cuba also covered (Byelorussian Soviet Socialist Republic) Byelorussian SSR (1953–1954), (Ukrainian Soviet Socialist Republic) Ukrainian SSR (1953–1954), (Estonian Soviet Socialist Republic) Estonian SSR (1953–1975), (Latvian Soviet Socialist Republic) Latvian SSR (1953–1975), (Lithuanian Soviet Socialist Republic) Lithuanian SSR (1953–1975) and (Moldavian Soviet Socialist Republic) Moldavian SSR (1953–1990)
Turkmen	Turkmen	(Turkmen Soviet Socialist Republic) Turkmen SSR (1953–1991); Turkmenistan (1991–present)	2 March 1953	present	Azatlyk Radiosy	as Radio Liberty
Georgian	Georgian	(Georgian Soviet Socialist Republic) Georgian SSR (1953–1991); Georgia (1991–present)	3 March 1953	present	რადიო თავისუფლება	as Radio Liberty also covered Abkhaz ASSR between 1953 and 1991, Autonomous Republic of Abkhazia (1991–2009), Abkhazia (1992–2009, disputed), (Georgian Soviet Socialist Republic) South Ossetian Autonomous Oblast (1953–1991) and South Ossetia (1991–2009, disputed)
North Caucasus	Adyghe	(Russian Soviet Federative Socialist Republic) Adyghe Autonomous Oblast (1953–1970s)	18 March 1953	1970s	—	as Radio Liberty covered by Russian Service (1970s–2009) and by Ekho Kavkaza Service (2009–present)
North Caucasus	Ingush	Ingush inhabited lands of the North Ossetian ASSR (1953–1957); Checheno-Ingush ASSR (1957–1970s)	18 March 1953	1970s	—	as Radio Liberty covered by Russian Service (1970s–2009) and by Ekho Kavkaza Service (2009–present)
North Caucasus	Karachay-Balkar	Kabardino-Balkarian ASSR (Russian Soviet Federative Socialist Republic) Karachay-Cherkess Autonomous Oblast	18 March 1953	1970s	—	as Radio Liberty covered by Russian Service (1970s–2009) and by Ekho Kavkaza Service (2009–present)
North Caucasus	Ossetian	North Ossetian ASSR	18 March 1953	1970s	—	as Radio Liberty covered by Russian Service (1970s–2009) and by Ekho Kavkaza Service (2009–present)
Armenian	Armenian	(Armenian Soviet Socialist Republic) Armenian SSR (1953–1991); Armenia (1991–present)	18 March 1953	present	Ազատություն ռադիոկայան	as Radio Liberty
Azerbaijani	Azerbaijani	(Azerbaijan Soviet Socialist Republic) Azerbaijan SSR (1953–1991); Azerbaijan (1991–present)	18 March 1953	present	Azadlıq Radiosu	as Radio Liberty
Kazakh	Kazakh	(Kazakh Soviet Socialist Republic) Kazakh SSR (1953–1991); Kazakhstan (1991–present)	18 March 1953	present	Azattyq Radiosy	as Radio Liberty
Kyrgyz	Kyrgyz	(Kirghiz Soviet Socialist Republic) Kirghiz SSR (1953–1991); Kyrgyzstan (1991–present)	18 March 1953	present	Азаттык үналгысы	as Radio Liberty
Tajik	Tajik	(Tajik Soviet Socialist Republic) Tajik SSR (1953–1991); Tajikistan (1991–present)	18 March 1953	present	Радиои Озодӣ	as Radio Liberty
Uzbek	Uzbek	(Uzbek Soviet Socialist Republic) Uzbek SSR (1953–1991); Uzbekistan (1991–present)	18 March 1953	present	Ozodlik Radiosi	as Radio Liberty
North Caucasus	Avar	Dagestan ASSR (1953–1970s); Dagestan (2002–2016)	18 March 1953; 3 April 2002	1970s 31 May 2016	—	as Radio Liberty covered by Russian Service (1970s–2002) and Ekho Kavkaza Service (2016–present); Caucasian Avars
North Caucasus	Chechen	Chechen inhabited lands of the Stavropol Krai (1953–1957); Checheno-Ingush ASSR (1957–1970s); Chechnya (2002–present)	18 March 1953; 3 April 2002	1970s present	Маршо Радио	as Radio Liberty covered by Russian Service (1970s–2002)
Tatar-Bashkir	Tatar	Tatar ASSR (1953–1991); Tatarstan (1991–present)	11 December 1953	present	Azatlıq Radiosı	as Radio Liberty
Belarusian	Belarusian	(Byelorussian Soviet Socialist Republic) Byelorussian SSR (1954–1991); Belarus (1991–present)	20 May 1954	present	Радыё Свабода	as Radio Liberty covered by Russian Service between 1953 and 1954
Ukrainian	Ukrainian	(Ukrainian Soviet Socialist Republic) Ukrainian SSR (1954–1991); Ukraine (1991–present)	16 August 1954	present	Радіо Свобода	as Radio Liberty covered by Russian Service between 1953 and 1954
Czechoslovak	Rusyn	Prešov Region	1954	1955	—	covered by the Slovak Desk of the Czechoslovak Service (1950–1954, 1955–1993) and by Slovak Service (1993–2004); Rusyns
Central Asia	Karakalpak	Karakalpak ASSR	1960s	1970s	—	as Radio Liberty covered by Uzbek Service (1953–1960s, 1970s–present)
Tatar-Bashkir	Crimean Tatar	Crimean Oblast (1960s–1991); Crimean ASSR (1991–1992); Autonomous Republic of Crimea (1992–present); Republic of Crimea (2014–present, disputed); Sevastopol (1960s–present)	1960s	present	Qırım Aqiqat	as Radio Liberty covered by Russian Service (1953–1954) and Ukrainian Service (1954–1960s)
Uyghur	Uyghur	(Kazakh Soviet Socialist Republic) Kazakh SSR (1966–1979) (Uzbek Soviet Socialist Republic) Uzbek SSR (1966–1979) (Kirghiz Soviet Socialist Republic) Kirghiz SSR (1966–1979)	October 1966	15 February 1979	—	as Radio Liberty covered by Kazakh, Kyrgyz and Uzbek Services (1953–1966, 1979–1998) covered by Uyghur Service of Radio Free Asia (1998–present); Uyghurs in Kazakhstan; Uyghurs in Kyrgyzstan
Lithuanian	Lithuanian	(Lithuanian Soviet Socialist Republic) Soviet Lithuania (1975–1990); Lithuania (1990–2004)	16 February 1975	31 January 2004	—	as Radio Liberty until 1984, then as Radio Free Europe. covered by Russian Service between 1953 and 1975
Latvian	Latvian	(Latvian Soviet Socialist Republic) Soviet Latvia (1975–1990); Latvia (1990–2004)	5 July 1975	31 January 2004	—	as Radio Liberty until 1984, then as Radio Free Europe covered by Russian Service between 1953 and 1975
Latvian	Latgalian	(Latvian Soviet Socialist Republic) Soviet Latvia (1975–1990); Latvia (1990–2004)	5 July 1975	31 January 2004	—	as Radio Liberty until 1984, then as Radio Free Europe covered by Russian Service between 1953 and 1975; Latgalians
Estonian	Estonian	(Estonian Soviet Socialist Republic) Soviet Estonia (1975–1990); Estonia (1990–2004)	1975	31 January 2004	—	as Radio Liberty until 1984, then as Radio Free Europe covered by Russian Service between 1953 and 1975
Afghan	Dari	Democratic Republic of Afghanistan (1985–1987); Republic of Afghanistan (1987–1992); Islamic State of Afghanistan (1992–1993); Transitional Islamic State of Afghanistan (2002–2004); Islamic Republic of Afghanistan (2004–2021); Islamic Emirate of Afghanistan (2021–present)	1 October 1985; 30 January 2002	19 October 1993 present	رادیو آزادی	as Radio Liberty as Radio Free Afghanistan between 1985 and 1993
Afghan	Pashto	Democratic Republic of Afghanistan (1985–1987); Republic of Afghanistan (1987–1992); Islamic State of Afghanistan (1992–1993); Transitional Islamic State of Afghanistan (2002–2004); Islamic Republic of Afghanistan (2004–2021); Islamic Emirate of Afghanistan (2021–present)	September 1987; 30 January 2002	19 October 1993 present	راډیو ازادي	as Radio Liberty covered by Radio Free Afghanistan between 1985 and 1993
Tatar-Bashkir	Bashkir	Bashkortostan	early 1990s	present	Idel.Реалии	as Radio Liberty covered by Russian Service (1953–early 1990s)
Czech	Czech	Czech Republic	1 January 1993	31 January 2004	—	activated as Czech Desk of the Czechoslovak Service, between 1950 and 1993 operated as RSE Inc. (1995–2002)
Slovak	Slovak	Slovakia	4 January 1993	31 January 2004	—	activated as Slovak Desk of the Czechoslovak Service, between 1950 and 1993
Balkan	Croatian	Croatia; Federation of Bosnia and Herzegovina; Brčko District	31 January 1994	September 2018	—	Croats of Bosnia and Herzegovina
Balkan	Serbian	Serbia; Republika Srpska; Brčko District; Montenegro; Kosovo; North Macedonia; Croatia	31 January 1994	present	Radio Slobodna Evropa	Serbs of Bosnia and Herzegovina; Serbs of Montenegro; Kosovo Serbs; Serbs in North Macedonia; Serbs of Croatia
Balkan	Bosnian	Bosnia and Herzegovina	31 January 1994	present	Radio Slobodna Evropa	
RWE Inc.	Polish	Poland	1 January 1995	1997	—	as Radio Wolna Europa (RWE Inc.) activated as Polish Service (1950–1994)
RSE Inc.	Czech	Czech Republic	1 January 1995	30 September 2002	—	as Radio Svobodna Europa (RSE Inc.) activated as part of Czechoslovak Service (1950–1992) and as Czech Service (1993–1995)
Moldovan	Romanian	Republic of Moldova	1998	present	Radio Europa Liberă	covered by the Romanian Service between 1950–1953 and 1990–1998 covered by the Russian Service between 1953 and 1990; Romanian Service merged into it in 2008; Romanian Service split from it in 2019
Radio Free Iraq	Arabic	Iraqi Republic (1998–2003); Iraqi Republic (provisional) (2003–2004); Republic of Iraq (2004–2015)	30 October 1998	31 July 2015	إذاعة العراق الحر	merged into Radio Sawa
Balkan	Albanian	Kosovo	8 March 1999	present	Radio Evropa e Lirë	covered by the Serbian Desk of Balkan Service between 1994 and 1999
Persian	Persian	Iran	30 October 1998	1 December 2002	—	merged into Radio Farda
Latvian	Russian	Latvia	February 2001	31 January 2004	—	as Radio Liberty covered by Russian Service (1953–1975) and by Latvian Service (1975–2001); Russians in Latvia
Balkan	Montenegrin	Montenegro	1 June 2000	present	Radio Slobodna Evropa	covered by the Serbian Desk of Balkan Service between 1994 and 2000
Balkan	Macedonian	North Macedonia	1 September 2001	present	Радио Слободна Европа	
North Caucasus	Kabardian	Kabardino-Balkaria; Karachay-Cherkessia	3 April 2002	31 May 2016	—	as Radio Liberty covered by Russian Service (1953–2002) and Ekho Kavkaza Service (2016–present)
Radio Farda	Persian	Iran	19 December 2002	present	فردا رادیو	covered by Persian Service between 1998 and 2002
	Russian	Abkhazia; South Ossetia	2 November 2009	present	Эхо Кавказа	as Echo of the Caucasus covered by Georgian Service between 1953 and 2009 also covers Adygea, Dagestan, Ingushetia, Karachay-Cherkessia, Kabardino-Balkaria and North Ossetia–Alania
Radio Mashaal	Pashto	Khyber Pakhtunkhwa	15 January 2010	present	مشال راډیو	as Radio Liberty

== Cold War years ==
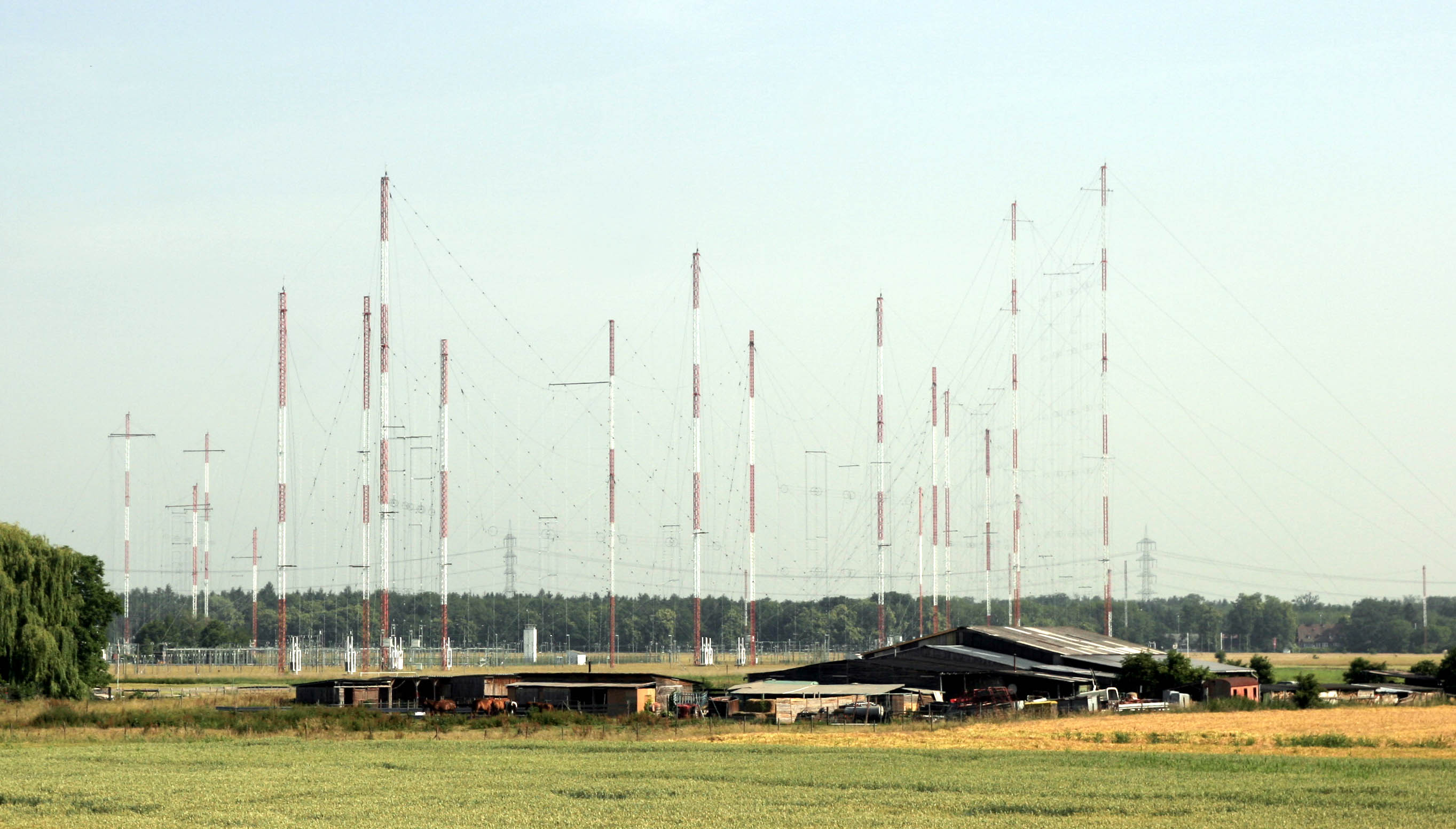
Radio Free Europe/Radio Liberty transmitter site, Biblis, Germany, 2007

=== Radio Free Europe ===
According to certain European politicians such as Petr Nečas, RFE played a significant role in the collapse of communism and the development of democracy in Eastern Europe. Unlike government-censored programs, RFE publicized anti-Soviet protests and nationalist movements. Its audience increased substantially following the failed Berlin riots of 1953 and the highly publicized defection of Józef Światło. Arch Puddington argues that its Hungarian service's coverage of Poland's Poznań riots in 1956 served as an inspiration for the Hungarian revolution that year.

==== Hungary ====
During the Hungarian Revolution of 1956, RFE broadcasts encouraged rebels to fight and suggested that Western support was imminent. (Note: The RFE broadcast's ('notorious', according to Rawnley) role in the crisis was established by a United Nations Committee looking into the crisis in 1957 already.) These RFE broadcasts violated Eisenhower's policy, which had determined that the United States would not provide military support for the Revolution. A number of changes were implemented at RFE in the wake of this scandal, including the establishment of the Broadcast Analysis Division to ensure that broadcasts were accurate and professional while maintaining the journalists' autonomy.

==== Romania ====
RFE was seen as a serious threat by Romanian president Nicolae Ceaușescu. From the mid-1970s to his overthrow and execution in December 1989, Ceaușescu waged a vengeful war against the RFE/RL under the program "Ether". Ether operations included physical attacks on Romanian journalists working for RFE/RL, including the controversial circumstances surrounding the deaths of three directors of RFE/RL's Romanian Service.

==== 1981 RFE/RL Munich bombing ====
On 21 February 1981, RFE/RL's headquarters in Munich was struck by a massive bomb, causing $2 million in damage. Several employees were injured, but there were no fatalities. Stasi files opened after 1989 indicated that the bombing was carried out by a group under the direction of Ilich Ramírez Sánchez (known as "Carlos the Jackal"), and paid for by Nicolae Ceaușescu, president of Romania.

But, according to the former head of the KGB Counterintelligence Department K, general Oleg Kalugin, the bombing operation was planned over two years by Department K, with the active involvement of a KGB mole inside the radio station, Oleg Tumanov. This revelation directly implicates KGB colonel Oleg Nechiporenko, who recruited Tumanov in the early 1960s and was his Moscow curator. Nechiporenko has never denied his involvement. In an interview with Radio Liberty in 2003, he justified the bombing on the grounds that RFE/RL was an American propaganda tool against the Soviet Union. Tumanov was exfiltrated back to the USSR in 1986. Nechiporenko contacts with Carlos in the 1970s were confirmed by Nechiporenko himself in an article published by Segodnya in 2000 and by an article in Izvestia in 2001.

==== Chernobyl disaster ====
For the first two days following the Chernobyl disaster on 26 April 1986, the official Eastern Bloc media did not report any news about the disaster, nor any full account for another four months. According to the Hoover Institute, the people of the Soviet Union "became frustrated with inconsistent and contradictory reports", and 36% of them turned to Western radio to provide accurate and pertinent information. Listenership at RFE/RL "shot up dramatically" as a "great many hours" of broadcast time were devoted to the dissemination of life-saving news and information following the disaster. Broadcast topics included "precautions for exposure to radioactive fallout" and reporting on the plight of the Estonians who were tasked with providing the clean-up operations in Ukraine.

==== Poland and Czechoslovakia ====
Communist governments also sent agents to infiltrate RFE's headquarters. Although some remained on staff for extended periods of time, government authorities discouraged their agents from interfering with broadcast activity, fearing that this could arouse suspicions and detract from their original purpose of gathering information on the radio station's activities. From 1965 to 1971, an agent of the SB (Służba Bezpieczeństwa, Communist Poland's security service) successfully infiltrated the station with an operative, Captain Andrzej Czechowicz. According to former Voice of America Polish service director Ted Lipien:

"Czechowicz is perhaps the most well known communist-era Polish spy who was still an active agent while working at RFE in the late 1960s. Technically, he was not a journalist. As a historian by training, he worked in the RFE's media analysis service in Munich. After more than five years, Czechowicz returned to Poland in 1971 and participated in programs aimed at embarrassing Radio Free Europe and the United States government."

According to Richard Cummings, former Security Chief of Radio Free Europe, other espionage incidents included a failed attempt by a Czechoslovak Intelligence Service (StB) agent in 1959 to poison the salt shakers in the organization's cafeteria.

In late 1960, an upheaval in the Czechoslovak service led to a number of dramatic changes in the organization's structure. RFE's New York headquarters could no longer effectively manage their Munich subsidiary. As a result, major management responsibilities were transferred to Munich, making RFE a European-based organization.

According to Puddington, Polish Solidarity leader Lech Wałęsa and Russian reformer Grigory Yavlinsky would later recall secretly listening to the broadcasts despite the heavy jamming.

=== Jamming ===
The Soviet government turned its efforts towards blocking reception of Western programs. To limit access to foreign broadcasts, the Central Committee decreed that factories should remove all components allowing short-wave reception from USSR-made radio receivers. However, consumers easily learned that the necessary spare parts were available on the black market, and electronics engineers opposing the idea would gladly convert radios back to being able to receive short-wave transmissions.

The most extensive form of reception obstruction was radio jamming. This was controlled by the KGB, which in turn reported to the Central Committee. Jamming was an expensive and arduous procedure, and its efficacy is still debated. In 1958, the Central Committee mentioned that the sum spent on jamming was greater than the sum spent on domestic and international broadcasting combined. The Central Committee has admitted that circumventing jamming was both possible and practised in the Soviet Union. Due to limited resources, authorities prioritized jamming based on the location, language, time, and theme of Western transmissions. Highly political programs in Russian, broadcast at prime time to urban centers, were perceived as the most dangerous. Seen as less politically threatening, Western music such as jazz was often transmitted unjammed.

During and after the Cuban Missile Crisis in late 1962, jamming was intensified. The Cuban Missile Crisis, however, was followed by a five-year period when the jamming of most foreign broadcasters ceased, only to intensify again with the Prague Spring in 1968. It ceased again in 1973, when Henry Kissinger became the U.S. Secretary of State. The end to jamming came abruptly on 21 November 1988 when Soviet and Eastern European jamming of virtually all foreign broadcasts, including RFE/RL services, ceased at 21:00 CET.

=== United States ===
During the Cold War, RFE was often criticized in the United States as not being sufficiently anti-communist. Although its non-governmental status spared it from full scale McCarthyist investigations, several RFE journalists, including the director of the Czech service, Ferdinand Peroutka, were accused of being soft on Communism. Fulton Lewis, a U.S. radio commentator and fervent anti-communist, was one of RFE's sharpest critics throughout the 1950s. His critical broadcasts inspired other journalists to investigate the inner workings of the organization, including its connection to the CIA. When its CIA ties were exposed in the 1960s, direct funding responsibility shifted to Congress.

==== Funding ====
RFE/RL received funds from the CIA until 1972. The CIA's relationship with the radio stations began to break down in 1967, when Ramparts magazine published an exposé claiming that the CIA was channeling funds to civilian organizations. Further investigation into the CIA's funding activities revealed its connection to both RFE and RL, sparking significant media outrage.

In 1971, the radio stations came under public spotlight once more when U.S. Senator Clifford Case introduced Senate Bill 18, which would have removed funding for RFE and RL from the CIA's budget, appropriated $30 million to pay for fiscal year 1972 activities, and required the State Department to temporarily oversee the radio stations.

In May 1972, President Richard Nixon appointed a special commission to deliberate RFE/RL's future. The commission proposed that funding come directly from the United States Congress and that a new organization, the Board for International Broadcasting (BIB) would simultaneously link the stations and the federal government, and serve as an editorial buffer between them.

According to Arch Puddington, a former bureau manager for RFE/RL, though both radio stations initially received most of their funding from the CIA, RFE maintained a strong sense of autonomy. Under Cord Meyer, the CIA officer in charge of overseeing broadcast services from 1954 to 1971, the CIA took a position of minimal government interference in radio affairs and programming.

In 1974, they came under the control of an organization called the Board for International Broadcasting (BIB). The BIB was designed to receive appropriations from Congress, give them to radio managements, and oversee the appropriation of funds. On 1 October 1976, the two radio stations merged to form Radio Free Europe/Radio Liberty (RFE/RL) and added the three Baltic language services to their repertoire.

== 1980s: Glasnost and the Iron Curtain's fall ==
Funding for RFE/RL increased during the Reagan administration. President Ronald Reagan, a fervent anticommunist, urged the stations to be more critical of the communist regimes. This presented a challenge to RFE/RL's broadcast strategy, which had been very cautious since the controversy over its alleged role in the Hungarian Revolution.

During the Mikhail Gorbachev era in the Soviet Union under Glasnost, RFE/RL benefited significantly from the Soviet Union's new openness. Gorbachev stopped the practice of jamming the broadcasts. In addition, dissident politicians and officials could be freely interviewed by RFE/RL for the first time without fearing persecution or imprisonment. By 1990, Radio Liberty had become the most listened-to Western radio station broadcasting to the Soviet Union.

Its coverage of the 1991 August coup enriched sparse domestic coverage of the event and drew in a wide audience. The broadcasts allowed Gorbachev and Boris Yeltsin to stay in touch with the Russian people during this turbulent period. Boris Yeltsin later expressed his gratitude through a presidential decree allowing Radio Liberty to open a permanent bureau in Moscow. The Economist credited RFE/RL with the dissolution of the Soviet Union.

=== Czechoslovakia's Velvet Revolution ===
Following the 17 November demonstrations in 1989 and brutal crackdown by Czechoslovak riot police, Drahomíra Dražská, a porter at a dormitory in Prague, reported that a student, Martin Šmíd, had been killed during the clashes. The Charter 77 activist Petr Uhl believed this account and passed it along to major news organizations, who broadcast it. After Reuters and the Voice of America reported the story, RFE/RL decided to run it too. However, the report later turned out to be false. The story is credited by many sources with inspiring Czechoslovak citizens to join the subsequent (larger) demonstrations which eventually brought down the communist government. Czech journalist Petr Brod, was stationed in Prague as RFE/RL's first permanent correspondent in post-revolutionary Czechoslovakia, witnessing firsthand the fall of the communist regime during the Velvet Revolution.

== After 1991 ==
In 1995, RFE/RL moved its headquarters from Munich to Prague, to the former Czechoslovak Federal Assembly building, which had been vacant since the 1992 dissolution of Czechoslovakia. Among the journalists who joined the Prague newsroom was former Voice of America correspondent Jolyon Naegele, who worked there as an editor from 1996 to 2003. The Clinton Administration reduced funding significantly and placed the service under the United States Information Agency's oversight.[80]

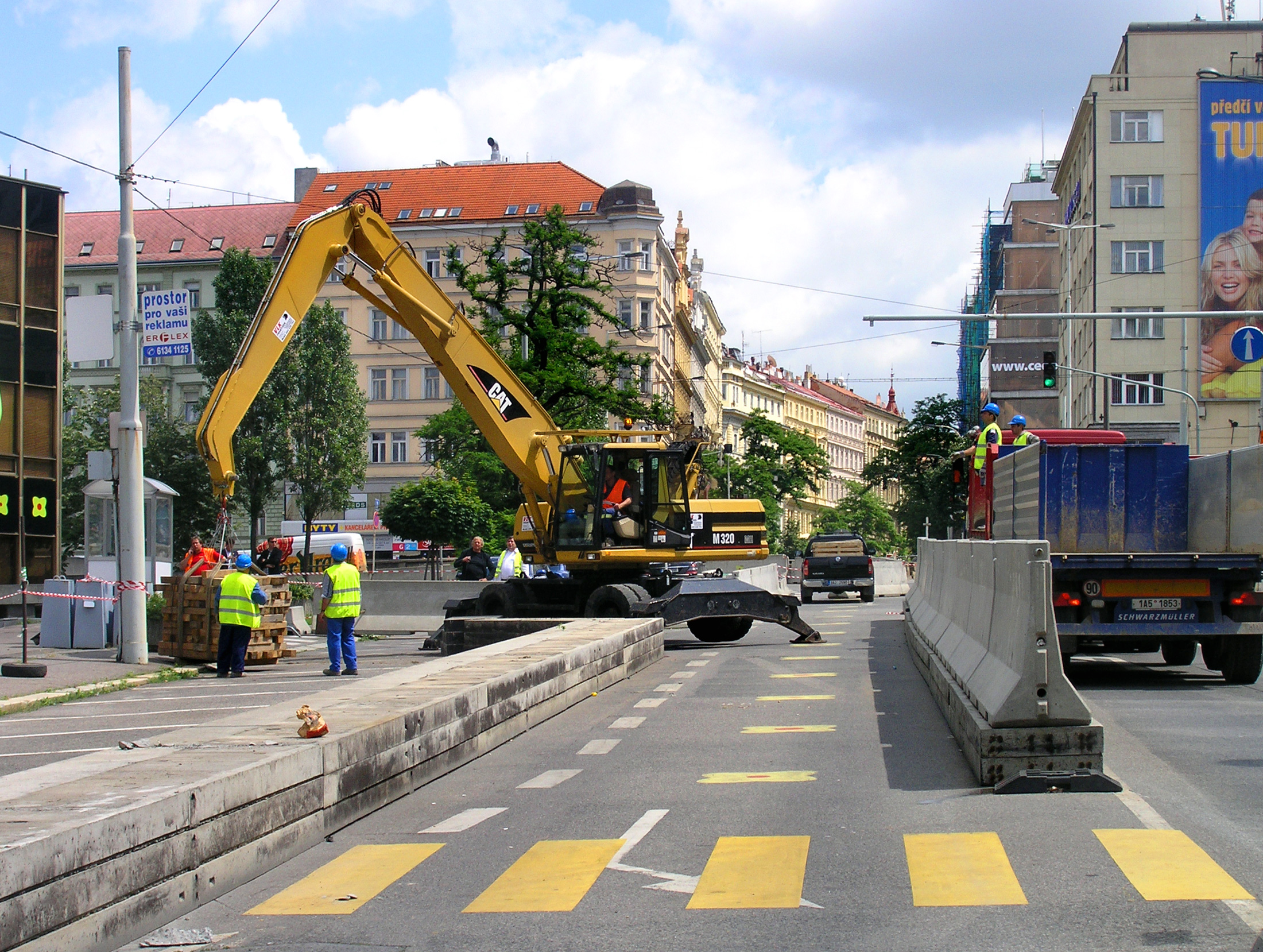
In 1994–2008, RFE/RL used the former Federal Parliament building of the abolished Czechoslovakia in Prague New Town. For many years after the 9/11 attacks in 2001 in the US, the building was protected by security concrete barriers. These reduced the capacity of the most frequented roads in Prague center.

RFE/RL ended broadcasts to Hungary in 1993 and stopped broadcasts to Poland in 1997. On 31 January 1994, RFE/RL launched broadcasts to the former Yugoslavia in Bosnian, Croatian, and Serbian languages. In the late 1990s, RFE/RL launched broadcasts in Albanian to Kosovo and to North Macedonia in Macedonian. Broadcasts to the Czech Republic proceeded for three more years under the agreement with Czech Radio. In 2004 RFE/RL stopped broadcasting to Bulgaria, Croatia, Estonia, Latvia, Lithuania, Montenegro, Romania, and Slovakia.

RFE/RL Chief Jeffrey Gedmin said in 2008 that the agency's mission is to serve as a surrogate free press in countries where such press is banned by the government or not fully established. It maintains 20 local bureaus. Governments that are subjected to critical reporting often attempt to obstruct the station's activities through a range of tactics, including extensive jamming, shutting down local re-broadcasting affiliates, or finding legal excuses to close down offices.

RFE/RL says that its journalists and freelancers often risk their lives to broadcast information, and their safety has always been a major issue. Reporters have frequently been threatened and persecuted. RFE/RL also faces a number of central security concerns, including cyberterrorist attacks and general terrorist threats. After the September 11 attacks, American and Czech authorities agreed to move RFE/RL's Prague headquarters away from the city center in order to make it less vulnerable to terrorist attack. On 19 February 2009, RFE/RL began broadcasting from its new headquarters east of the city center.

=== Beyond Europe ===
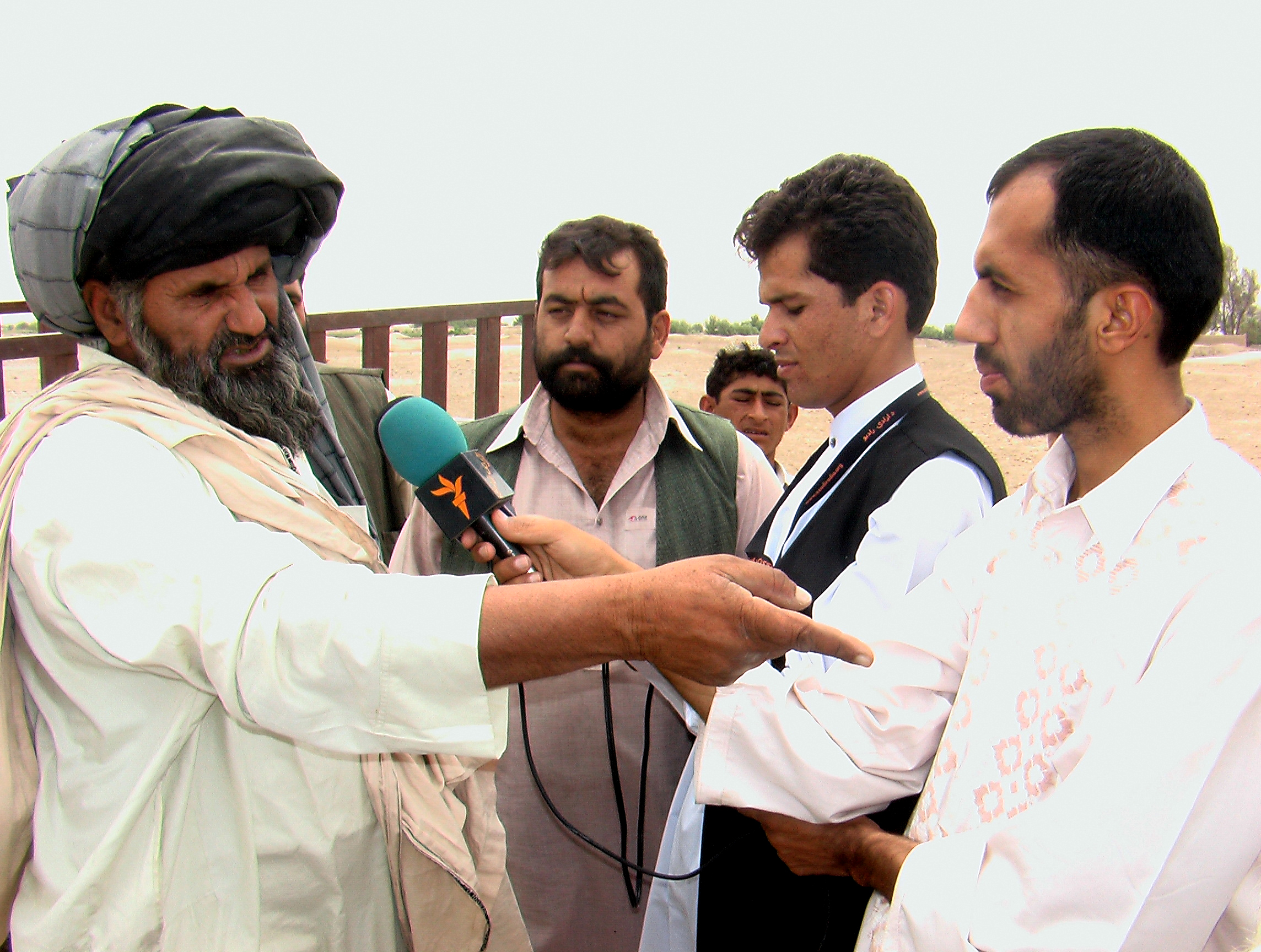
A reporter for RFE/RL's Afghan Service interviews a citizen in Helmand, Afghanistan.

On 1 January 2009, Azerbaijan imposed a ban on all foreign media in the country, including RFE/RL. Kyrgyzstan suspended broadcasts of Radio Azattyk, RFE/RL's Kyrgyz language service, because it had asked that the government be able to pre-approve its programming. Other states such as Belarus, Iran, Turkmenistan, Tajikistan, and Uzbekistan prohibit re-broadcasting to local stations, making programming difficult for average listeners to access.

In 1998, RFE/RL began broadcasting to Iraq. Iraqi president Saddam Hussein ordered Iraqi Intelligence Service, to "violently disrupt the Iraqi broadcasting of Radio Free Europe". IIS planned to attack the headquarters with an RPG-7 from a window across the street. Czech Security Information Service (BIS) foiled the plot.

In 2008, Afghan president Hamid Karzai urged his government to provide assistance to a rape victim after listening to her story on Radio Azadi, RFE/RL's Afghan service. According to REF/RL in 2009, Radio Azadi was the most popular radio station in Afghanistan, and Afghan listeners mailed hundreds of hand-written letters to the station each month.

In September 2009, RFE/RL announced that it would begin new Pashto-language broadcasting to the Afghanistan–Pakistan border region.

The following month RFE/RL introduced a daily, one-hour Russian-language broadcast, broadcasting to the breakaway regions of South Ossetia and Abkhazia. The program, called Ekho Kavkaza (Echo of the Caucasus), focused on local and international news and current affairs, organized in coordination with RFE/RL's Georgian Service.

On 15 January 2010, RFE/RL began broadcasting to the Pashtun tribal areas of Pakistan in Pashto. The service, known as Radio Mashaal ("Torch"), was created in an attempt to counter the growing number of local Islamic extremist radio stations broadcasting in the border region between Pakistan and Afghanistan. Radio Mashaal says that it broadcasts local and international news with in-depth reports on terrorism, politics, women's issues, and health care (with an emphasis on preventive medicine). The station broadcasts roundtable discussions and interviews with tribal leaders and local policymakers, in addition to regular call-in programs.

=== 2010s ===
On 14 October 2014, Radio Free Europe/Radio Liberty (RFE/RL) and the Voice of America (VOA) launched a new Russian-language TV news program, Current Time, "to provide audiences in countries bordering Russia with a balanced alternative to the disinformation produced by Russian media outlets that is driving instability in the region". Over the next two years, Current Time – led by RFE/RL in cooperation with VOA – expanded to become a 24/7 digital and TV stream for Russian-speaking audiences worldwide.

Around 2017, Voice of America and RFE/RL launched Polygraph.info, and the Russian-language factograph.info, as fact-checking sites. On 19 July 2018, RFE/RL announced it will be returning its news services to Bulgaria and Romania by the end of 2018 amid growing concern about a reversal in democratic gains and attacks on the rule of law and the judiciary in Bulgaria and in Romania. The Romanian news service re-launched on 14 January 2019, and the Bulgarian service re-launched on 21 January 2019. On 8 September 2020 the Hungarian service was also relaunched.

In a response to the United States Department of Justice requesting RT to register as a foreign agent under the Foreign Agents Registration Act, Russia's Justice Ministry also requested RFE/RL and Voice of America to register as foreign agents under the law ФЗ N 121-ФЗ / 20 July 2012 in December 2017.

=== 2020s ===
In the aftermath of Belarusian presidential elections of 2020, Radio Liberty and independent media resources experienced significant pressure from the government and law enforcement. Journalists’ accreditations were cancelled by the authorities on 2 October 2020. On 16 July 2021, the office in Minsk and homes of the journalists were raided by the police.

In Russia, the government designated the station's website as a "foreign agent" on 14 May 2021. RL's bank accounts were frozen. By that time, Roskomnadzor, the Russian mass media regulator, had initiated 520 cases against the broadcaster, with total fines for the RL's refusal to mark its content with the "foreign agent" label estimated at $2.4m. On 19 May 2021, RL filed a legal case at the European Court of Human Rights, accusing the Russian government of violating freedom of expression and freedom of the media.

In March 2023, a criminal case was opened against Moscow resident Yury Kokhovets, a participant in the RFE/RL's street poll. He faced up to 10 years in prison under Russia's 2022 war censorship laws.

In 2022, Radio Free Europe was awarded an Online Journalism Award for coverage of Russia's War on Ukraine.

In 2023, a court in Bishkek, capital of Kyrgyzstan, accepted a request from the Culture Ministry to ban the operations of RFE/RL's Kyrgyz Service.

On July 31, 2023, the European Parliament passed a resolution calling on the European Commission and the Member States to strengthen independent Belarusian media outlets and welcoming the relocation of RFE/RL to Lithuania from where it "provides credible media coverage for the audience in Belarus".

In September 2023, RFE/RL's Azerbaijani service, Radio Azadliq, was revealed to have a leadership with links to Azerbaijan's ruling authorities, which censored content critical of the Azerbaijani government and instead published content that promoted the government's agendas.

In February 2024, RFE was listed as an 'undesirable organization' by Russia, effectively making it illegal in the country.

In May 2024, RFE/RL journalist Farid Mehralizade was detained in Azerbaijan in connection with the "Abzas Media case". In June 2025, he was sentenced to 9 years in prison.

==== 2025 grant suspension ====
In February 2025 the Department of Government Efficiency (DOGE) proposed that RFE/RL and Voice of America be considered for closure as a cost saving measure for the U.S. government. The latest proposal comes after previous suggestions by other government officials to close RFE/RL.

On 14 March, Trump signed an executive order to eliminate USAGM, among other agencies, "to the maximum extent consistent with applicable law." An anonymous source told Politico that DOGE imposed a 30-day total freeze on funding to RFE/RL and other USAGM outlets, with the intention of making that permanent. On 15 March 2025, the United States Agency for Global Media terminated grants to RFE/RL and Radio Free Asia following a directive from the Trump administration. Reporters and other employees at broadcasters including RFE/RL received an email over the weekend stating that they would no longer be allowed access to their offices and would have to surrender press credentials, work phones, and other equipment. In response, Steve Capus, president of RFE/RL, said that "The cancellation of Radio Free Europe/Radio Liberty's grant agreement would be a massive gift to America's enemies." On 18 March, RFE/RL sued USAGM and two USAGM officials to block the grant termination.

On 22 March 2025, the Czech government pledged to support RFE/RL following funding cuts by the U.S. administration under President Donald Trump. Meanwhile, rock band R.E.M., who had an early hit with the song "Radio Free Europe", released a remixed version with proceeds going to the organization. In May 2025, Kaja Kallas stated that the EU would provide US$6.2 million to RFE/RL and Sweden pledged US$2 million.

== Programs ==
=== 49 Minutes of Jazz ===
The program was a musical review by Dmitri Savitski from 1989 to 2004. The theme song of the program was "So Tired" by Bobby Timmons. The program was cancelled on 10 April 2004, due to "the change of Liberty's format".

== See also ==
- Alhurra
- Operation Mockingbird and white propaganda
- Radio Free Asia
- Radio y Televisión Martí
- Women, Life, Freedom

== Bibliography ==
- Cummings, Richard (2008). "The Ether War: Hostile Intelligence Activities Directed Against Radio Free Europe, Radio Liberty, and the Émigré Community in Munich during the Cold War". Journal of Transatlantic Studies. 6 (2): 168–182. doi:10.1080/14794010802184374. S2CID 143544822.
- Holt, Robert T. Radio Free Europe (U of Minnesota Press, 1958)
- Johnson, Ian (2010). A Mosque in Munich. Houghton Mifflin Harcourt. ISBN 9780151014187.
- Johnson, A. Ross, Radio Free Europe and Radio Liberty: The CIA Years and Beyond. (Woodrow Wilson Center Press, Stanford University Press, 2010)
- Johnson, A. Ross and R. Eugene Parta (eds.), Cold War Broadcasting: Impact on the Soviet Union and Eastern Europe. (Budapest: Central European University Press, 2010)
- Machcewicz, Paweł. Poland's War on Radio Free Europe, 1950–1989 (Trans. by Maya Latynski. Cold War International History Project Series) (Stanford University Press, 2015). 456 pp. online review
- Rawnsley, Gary D. (1996). Radio Diplomacy and Propaganda. London: Palgrave Macmillan UK. doi:10.1007/978-1-349-24499-7. ISBN 978-1-349-24501-7.
- Mickelson, Sig (1983). America's Other Voice: the Story of Radio Free Europe and Radio Liberty. New York, NY: Praeger Publishers. ISBN 9780030632242.
- Mikkonen, Simo (Fall 2010). "Stealing the Monopoly of Knowledge?: Soviet Reactions to U.S. Cold War Broadcasting". Kritika: Explorations in Russian & Eurasian History. 11 (4): 771–805. doi:10.1353/kri.2010.0012. S2CID 159839411.
- Pomar, Mark G. Cold War Radio: The Russian Broadcasts of the Voice of America and Radio Free Europe/Radio Liberty (University of Nebraska Press, 2022) online scholarly book review
- Puddington, Arch (2003). Broadcasting Freedom: The Cold War Triumph of Radio Free Europe and Radio Liberty. Lexington: University Press of Kentucky.
- Sosin, Gene (1999). Sparks of Liberty: An Insider's Memoir of Radio Liberty. University Park: Pennsylvania State University Press.
- Urban, George R. (1997). Radio Free Europe and the pursuit of democracy: My War Within the Cold War. Yale University Press. Urban was the director of RFE in the 1980s.

In other languages

- Măgură Bernard, Ioana (2007). Directorul postului nostru de radio. Curtea Veche. ISBN 978-973-669-442-4.
- Molnár, József (2006). A Szabad Európa Rádió a forradalom napjaiban – Autobiography. Püski. ISBN 963-9592-10-2.
- Tofan, Liviu (2021). Ne-au ținut în viață – Radio Europa Liberă, 1970-1990. Editura Omnium. ISBN 978-606-95197-5-2.
- Tofan, Liviu (2021). Antologia Radio Europa Liberă – 101 contribuții (1956-1990). Editura Omnium. ISBN 978-606-95197-1-4.
