= Radio Mashaal =

Member of Radio Liberty in Pakistan

- مشال رېډیو
- Formation: 15 January 2010; 16 years ago
- Dissolved: 19 January 2018; 8 years ago (Islamabad bureau)
- Purpose: Media broadcasting
- Headquarters: Islamabad, Pakistan
- Region served: Primarily Khyber Pakhtunkhwa
- Official language: Pashto
- Parent organization: U.S. Agency for Global Media
- Affiliations: Radio Liberty
- Website: www.mashaalradio.com

Radio Mashaal (Pashto: مشال رېډیو) was the Pashto-language media broadcaster of Radio Liberty within Pakistan. It was launched on 15 January 2010. It operated out of the Pakistani capital city of Islamabad through a local office, which was shut down by the Government of Pakistan on 19 January 2018. It was aimed at broadcasting to Khyber Pakhtunkhwa.

The Mashaal Radio in Europe, more specifically in the organization, RFE/RL was launched on January 15, 2010, and it operated out of the capital city of Czech Republic, Prague. It was sadly shut down by the US Government on March 31, 2026.

Mashaal Radio
- مشال رېډیو
- Formation: 15 January 2010; 16 years ago
- Dissolved: 31 March 2026; 2 months ago (prague bureau)
- Purpose: Media broadcasting
- Headquarters: Prague, Czech Republic
- Location: Prague, Czech Republic
- Region served: Primarily Khyber Pakhtunkhwa
- Official language: Pashto
- Parent organization: U.S. Agency for Global Media
- Affiliations: Radio Liberty
- Website: www.mashaalradio.com
