= Marinhais =

- Civil parish
- Location in Portugal
- Coordinates: 39.05°N 8.71°W
- Country: Portugal
- Region: Oeste e Vale do Tejo
- Intermunic. comm.: Lezíria do Tejo
- District: Santarém
- Municipality: Salvaterra de Magos

Area
  - Total: 37.88 km^{2} (14.63 sq mi)

Population (2011)
  - Total: 6,336
  - Density: 170/km^{2} (430/sq mi)
- Time zone: UTC+00:00 (WET)
  - Summer (DST): UTC+01:00 (WEST)
- Website: marinhais.com

Marinhais is a parish of the Salvaterra de Magos Municipality in Portugal. The population in 2011 was 6,336, in an area of 37.88 km².

For centuries this land was named "Foros de Muge", since all the terrains belonged to the Muge parish but were uncultivated. The "camarinheiros" (Corema album) — shrubs of the Empetraceae family which produce small, red, inedible fruits called "camarinhas" — were so abundant that the original name Foros de Muge was gradually renamed to "Camarinhaes" by king Miguel of Portugal and his party on deer hunting trips in the municipality.

It is difficult to trace an historic evolution of Marinhais, because its first inhabitants were not locals but rather immigrants from the north of the country, namely from the municipalities of Pombal, Soure and Cantanhede. As main historic marks, the year 1875 is noted as the probable construction date of the S. Michael Archanjel chapel (Capela de S. Miguel Arcanjo). The inauguration of the railroad station in 1902 was another notable occurrence, with the presence of king Carlos of Portugal. It is unknown if whether by disfigurement of the original name Camarinhais, or with the purpose of simplifying it, the village was finally named "Marinhais". Finally, in 1927 Marinhais was proclaimed a parish.
