= Jolyon Naegele =

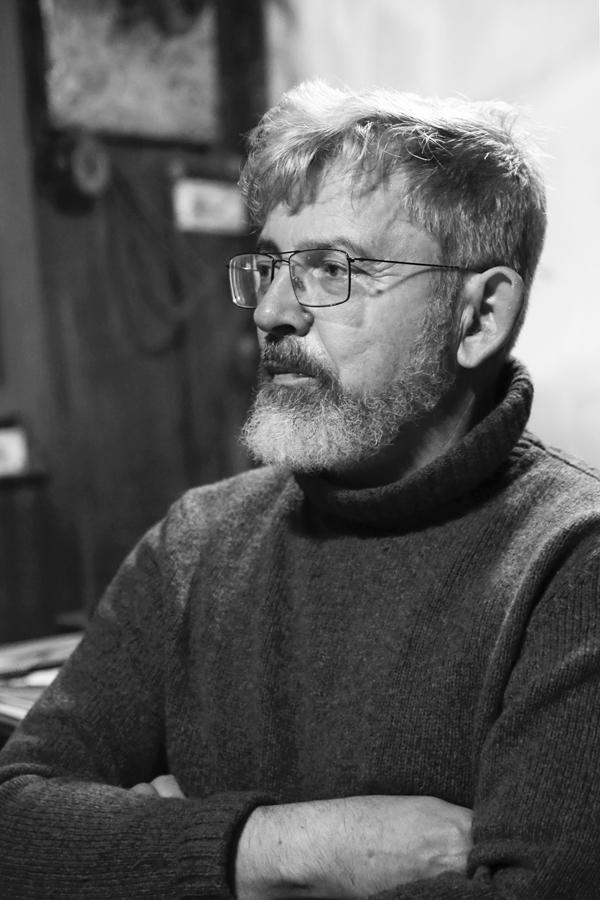
- Jolyon Naegele in Prague, 2024
- Born: April 19, 1955 (age 71); New York City, U.S.
- Education: City College of New York (BA); Johns Hopkins University SAIS (MA)
- Occupations: Journalist, political analyst, author
- Known for: Voice of America correspondent for Central and Eastern Europe; UNMIK political affairs officer
- Children: 1
- Awards: United States Information Agency Superior Honor Award (1988); Pelikán Prize (2019)

Jolyon Arthur Naegele (born April 19, 1955) is an American journalist and political analyst known for his reporting on Central and Eastern Europe during the final decade of communist rule. He served as the Voice of America (VOA) correspondent for the region from 1984 to 1994 and later worked as an editor at Radio Free Europe/Radio Liberty (RFE/RL). From 2003 to 2017 he was a political affairs officer with the United Nations Mission in Kosovo (UNMIK), eventually heading its Office of Political Affairs.

== Early life and education ==
Naegele was born in New York City. He studied international relations at the City College of New York (BA, 1976) and earned an MA in international relations from the Johns Hopkins University School of Advanced International Studies (SAIS) in Bologna and Washington (1978). He also studied Czech language and literature at the School of Slavonic and East European Studies in London. He speaks Czech, German, Russian, Polish and Italian. Among his professors were political scientists Ivo Ducháček, John Herz, and historians Randolph Braham and Vojtech Mastny.

== Career ==
=== Voice of America ===
Naegele joined Voice of America in 1984 as its correspondent for Central and Eastern Europe. Based in Vienna, Bonn and later Prague, he reported extensively on political developments in the Soviet bloc, including dissident movements, human rights issues, and the decline of communist regimes. He covered major events such as the rise of Solidarity in Poland, political pluralism in Hungary, ethnic tensions in Yugoslavia, and the Velvet Revolution in Czechoslovakia. His reporting from Czechoslovakia, including interviews with Václav Havel, Alexander Dubček and other dissidents, writers, and former communist leaders, as well as his coverage of anti-regime protests and trials of dissident activists made him widely known among Czech and Slovak audiences. Radio Prague International later described him as “a voice of the West for many Czechs in the 1980s.”

In 1988 he received the United States Information Agency Superior Honor Award for his work as VOA’s Vienna correspondent.

=== Radio Free Europe/Radio Liberty ===
From 1996 to 2003 Naegele worked as an editor at RFE/RL in Prague, focusing on Slovakia, the Western Balkans, Turkey and the Caucasus.

=== United Nations Mission in Kosovo ===
In 2003 he joined the United Nations Interim Administration Mission in Kosovo (UNMIK) as a political affairs officer. He later became head of the Office of Political Affairs, contributing to the UN Secretary‑General’s regular reports to the Security Council and serving as UNMIK’s first coordinator for the Pristina–Belgrade dialogue. His role and responsibilities are documented in UNMIK’s official leadership profiles.

== Public reception ==
BBC journalist Misha Glenny wrote in The Listener that Naegele’s impact on Czechoslovak politics during the late 1980s “was greater than most journalists can dream of in a lifetime,” noting his fluency in Czech and his ability to convey the nuances of local political life.

== Publications ==
Co‑author: Velvet Revolution After 30 Years (Karolinum, 2019).

== Awards ==
- United States Information Agency Superior Honor Award (1988)
- Pelikán Prize for contributions to political culture (2019)

== Personal life ==
Naegele has one daughter. He lives in the Czech Republic.
