= Glória do Ribatejo e Granho =

- Civil parish
- Location in Portugal
- Coordinates: 39.04°N 8.64°W
- Country: Portugal
- Region: Oeste e Vale do Tejo
- Intermunic. comm.: Lezíria do Tejo
- District: Santarém
- Municipality: Salvaterra de Magos

Area
  - Total: 84.65 km^{2} (32.68 sq mi)

Population (2011)
  - Total: 4,107
  - Density: 48.52/km^{2} (125.7/sq mi)
- Time zone: UTC+00:00 (WET)
  - Summer (DST): UTC+01:00 (WEST)

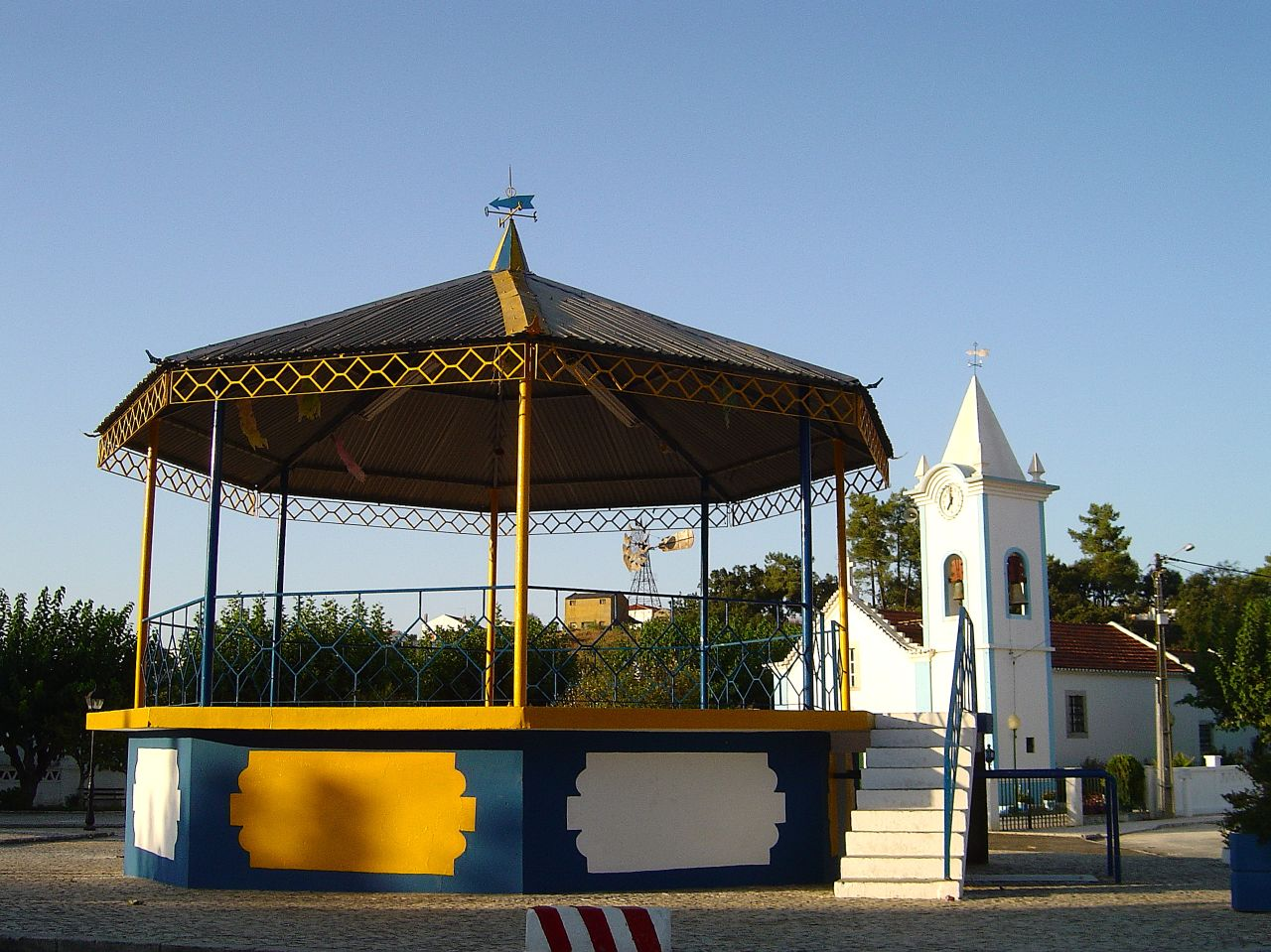
Glória do Ribatejo, Portugal

Glória do Ribatejo e Granho is a civil parish in the municipality of Salvaterra de Magos, Portugal. It was formed in 2013 by the merger of the former parishes Glória do Ribatejo and Granho. The population in 2011 was 4,107, in an area of 84.65 km².
