= Salvaterra de Magos e Foros de Salvaterra =

- Civil parish
- Location in Portugal
- Coordinates: 39.025°N 8.793°W
- Country: Portugal
- Region: Oeste e Vale do Tejo
- Intermunic. comm.: Lezíria do Tejo
- District: Santarém
- Municipality: Salvaterra de Magos

Area
  - Total: 71.80 km^{2} (27.72 sq mi)

Population (2011)
  - Total: 10,446
  - Density: 150/km^{2} (380/sq mi)
- Time zone: UTC+00:00 (WET)
  - Summer (DST): UTC+01:00 (WEST)

Salvaterra de Magos e Foros de Salvaterra is a civil parish in the municipality of Salvaterra de Magos, Portugal. It was formed in 2013 by the merger of the former parishes Salvaterra de Magos and Foros de Salvaterra. The population in 2011 was 10,446, in an area of 71.80 km².
