= Hagibor =

Locality in Prague

Coordinates: 50°4′44″N 14°28′49″E

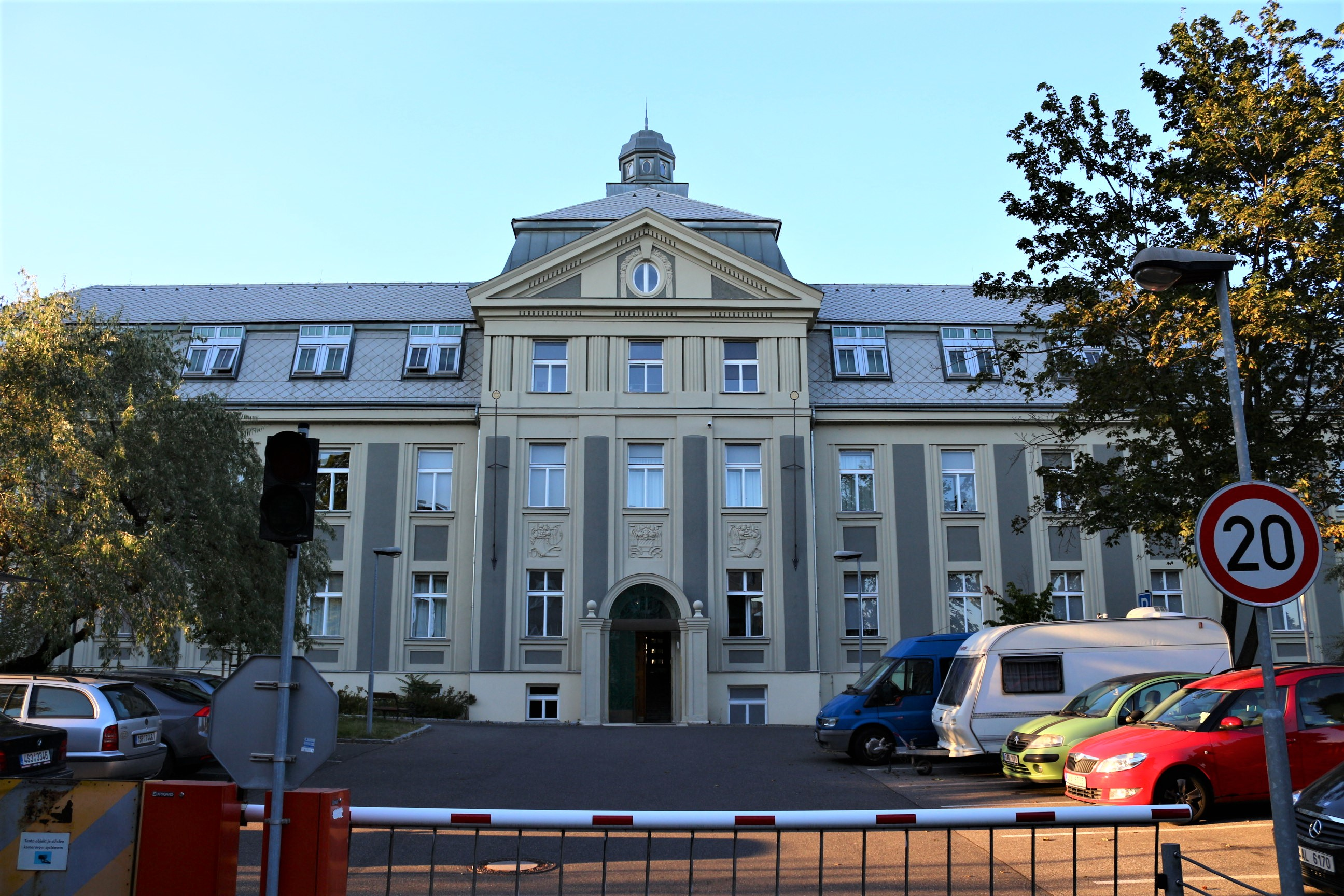
Social Care Home administered by the Jewish Community of Prague

Hagibor (Hebrew: הגיבור / ha-gibor, lit. "the hero") is a locality in the district of Strašnice (and partly Žižkov) in Prague, the capital of the Czech Republic.

The former local Jewish Czech sport club ŽSK Hagibor was located here, which gave the name to the area. The district also includes the headquarters of Radio Free Europe/Radio Liberty and affiliated broadcasts.
