= António Roquete (footballer) =

Portuguese footballer

António Fernandes Roquete
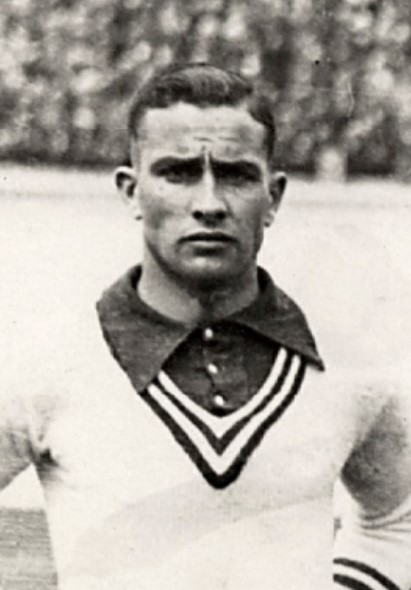
- António Roquete in 1928

Personal information
- Date of birth: 8 August 1906
- Place of birth: Salvaterra de Magos, Portugal
- Date of death: 18 December 1995 (aged 89)
- Place of death: Lisbon, Portugal
- Position(s): Goalkeeper

António Fernandes Roquete (8 August 1906 in Salvaterra de Magos – 18 December 1995 in Lisbon) was a Portuguese football goalkeeper.

== Career ==
Roquete is considered the first great goalkeeper from the Portuguese football, renowned for his elegance and elasticity, having played most of his career at Casa Pia A. C. He later would play for Sport Lisboa e Elvas, Valenciano and União do Funchal.

Roquete had 16 caps for Portugal, from his first match, a 2–4 loss to France, in Toulouse, at 18 April 1926, in a friendly match, aged only 19 years old, to his last, a 0–3 loss to Spain, in Vigo, at 2 April 1933, in another friendly match.

He played all the three games at the 1928 Football Olympic Tournament, where Portugal, after a 4–2 win over Chile and a 2–1 win over Yugoslavia, lost surprisingly to Egypt by 1–2, at the quarter-finals.

It was rumoured that he left the National Team aged only 26 because he joined the Portuguese Political Police, the PIDE. It was even rumoured that he participated directly in the detention of his former coach and friend Cândido de Oliveira. That was proved untrue and short after his detention, Roquete asked transference to Mozambique, where he would dedicate himself to the cashew business.
