= Fátima Felgueiras =

Portuguese politician

Mayor of Felgueiras
- In office 9 October 2005 – 28 October 2009
- Preceded by: António Pereira
- Succeeded by: Inácio Ribeiro
- In office 1 October 1995 – 5 January 2003
- Preceded by: Júlio Faria
- Succeeded by: António Pereira

Member of the Felgueiras City Council
- In office 17 December 1989 – 29 September 2013

Member of the Felgueiras Municipal Assembly
- In office 16 December 1979 – 17 December 1989

Personal details
- Born: Maria de Fátima da Cunha Felgueiras Almeida; 21 April 1954 (age 72) Rio de Janeiro, Brazil
- Citizenship: Portugal; Brazil
- Party: Independent (since 2003)
- Other political affiliations: Socialist Party (1979–2003)
- Children: 2, including Sandra Felgueiras
- Education: University of Coimbra
- Occupation: Teacher • Politician

Maria de Fátima da Cunha Felgueiras Almeida de Sousa Oliveira (born 21 April 1954) is a Portuguese politician. She is most known as former mayor of the Felgueiras municipality, in northern Portugal.

== Personal life ==
Fátima Felgueiras was born in Rio de Janeiro, then capital city of Brazil, from Portuguese parents. When she was 4 years old, the family returned to Portugal and settled in Felgueiras, northern Portugal. She studied in a secondary school of Guimarães and earned a degree in Germanic Philology from the University of Coimbra. Involved in local politics, Fátima Felgueiras took over as mayor of Felgueiras in 1995. Fátima Felgueiras has a daughter, Sandra Felgueiras, who is a well-known television reporter and journalist of RTP public service television network.

== Corruption allegations ==
She was placed under investigation after a series of anonymous letters addressed to Cunha Rodrigues at the public prosecutor's office. The police inquiry produced more than 120 volumes. The mayor of Felgueiras, Fátima Felgueiras, hurried through the streets of the small northwestern Portuguese city in the early afternoon of 5 May 2003. She was late for a funeral. But before she arrived at the cemetery, she took a phone call, returned home—and disappeared. The then 49-year-old fugitive has been charged with 30 counts of corruption, embezzlement, prevarication and abuse of power and was suspected of managing a US$1 million "saco azul" (blue bag) to pay for her own electoral propaganda, Socialist Party office rent and phone bills, her new Audi, among others. Felgueiras faced a possible 25-year sentence, according to the Guimarães Appeals Court (Tribunal da Relação de Guimarães). Seventeen other Town Hall employees and private entrepreneurs were involved in the scandal. Police sources said the mayor escaped to Rio de Janeiro (through Madrid and São Paulo) just before authorities received the warrant issued by the court. After several months in Brazil, and being the owner of a Brazilian passport, Fátima Felgueiras returned home to be arrested and released in less than 24 hours. She was re-elected for the Felgueiras Town Hall in October 2005, as an independent.

The trial was set to start in February 2007 but the case didn't produce any effect so far.
