= Salvaterra de Magos =

- Municipality
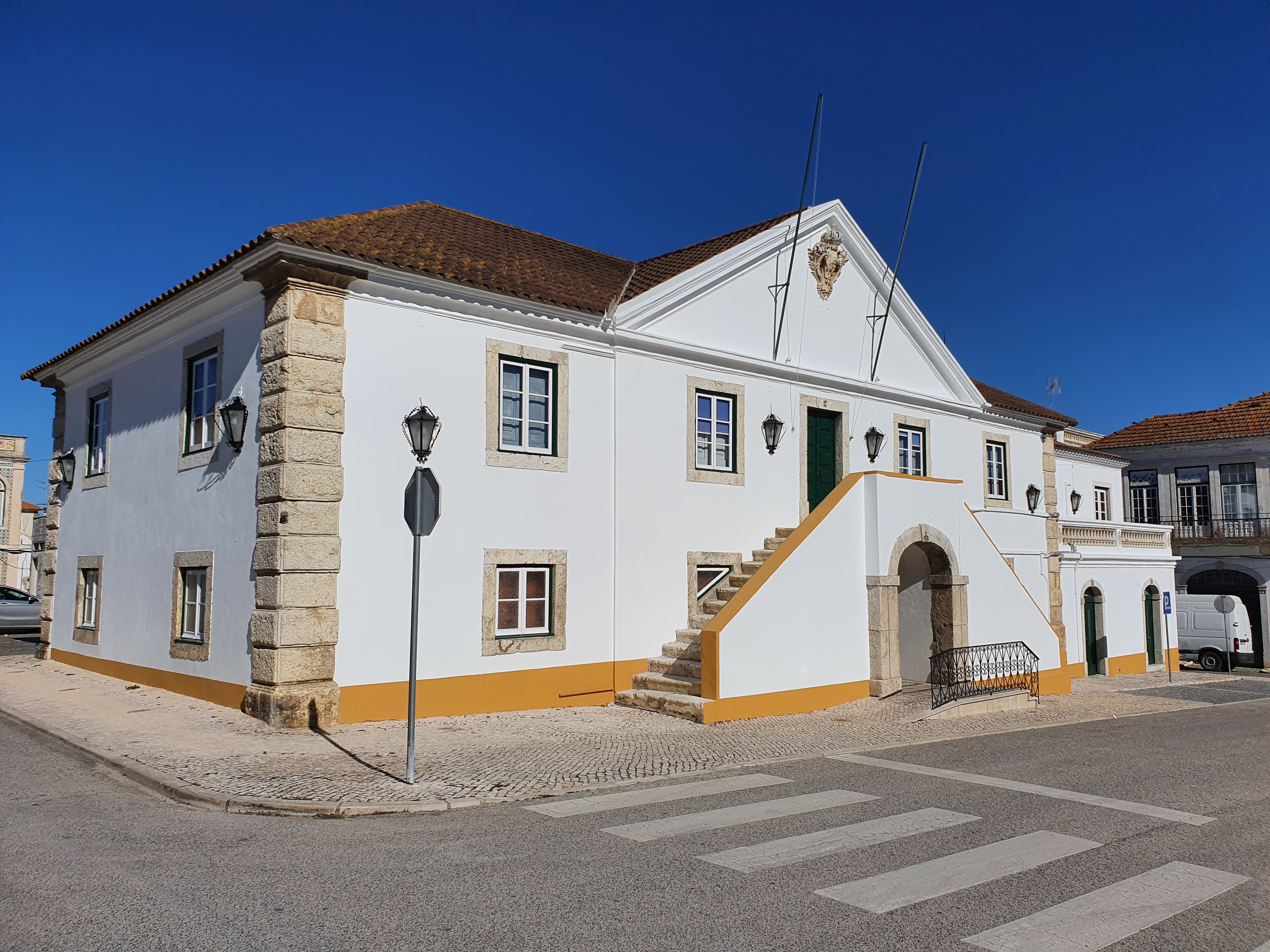
- Municipal Chamber of Salvaterra de Magos

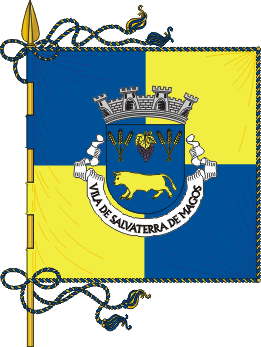
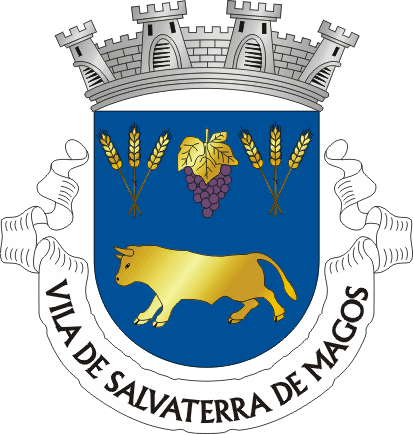
- Flag Coat of arms
- Interactive map of Salvaterra de Magos
- Coordinates: 39°01′N 8°47′W
- Country: Portugal
- Region: Oeste e Vale do Tejo
- Intermunic. comm.: Lezíria do Tejo
- District: Santarém
- Parishes: 4

Government
  - President: Hélder Manuel Ramalho de Sousa Esménio (PS)

Area
  - Total: 243.93 km^{2} (94.18 sq mi)

Population (2011)
  - Total: 22,159
  - Density: 90.842/km^{2} (235.28/sq mi)
- Time zone: UTC+00:00 (WET)
  - Summer (DST): UTC+01:00 (WEST)
- Local holiday: Ascension Day (date varies)
- Website: www.cm-salvaterrademagos.pt

Salvaterra de Magos (European Portuguese pronunciation: [ˌsalvɐˈtɛʁɐ ðɨ ˈmaɣuʃ]) is a municipality in the district of Santarém in Portugal. The population in 2011 was 22,159, in an area of 243.93 km^{2}.

The present Mayor is Hélder Manuel Ramalho de Sousa Esménio of the PS. The previous mayor Ana Cristina Pardal Ribeiro, had been the only mayor elected by the Left Bloc. The municipal holiday is Ascension Day.

It was once home to the Royal Palace of Salvaterra de Magos, a favored royal residence and hunting lodge of the Portuguese royal family. It was destroyed by fire in the early 19th century. Today, only the chapel and the falconry remain.

== Notable people ==
- António Roquete (1906 in Salvaterra de Magos – 1995 in Lisbon) a football goalkeeper with 16 caps for Portugal

== Climate ==
Climate data for Barragem de Magos, 1991-2020, altitude: 43 m (141 ft)
Month	Jan	Feb	Mar	Apr	May	Jun	Jul	Aug	Sep	Oct	Nov	Dec	Year
Daily mean °C (°F)	9.5 (49.1)	10.5 (50.9)	12.9 (55.2)	14.9 (58.8)	17.6 (63.7)	20.6 (69.1)	22.2 (72.0)	22.3 (72.1)	20.3 (68.5)	17.2 (63.0)	12.7 (54.9)	10.2 (50.4)	15.9 (60.6)
Average precipitation mm (inches)	68.1 (2.68)	51.7 (2.04)	51.9 (2.04)	58.0 (2.28)	46.2 (1.82)	17.4 (0.69)	2.5 (0.10)	5.5 (0.22)	26.6 (1.05)	85.2 (3.35)	95.0 (3.74)	82.8 (3.26)	590.9 (23.27)
Source: Portuguese Environment Agency

== Parishes ==
Administratively, the municipality is divided into 4 civil parishes (freguesias):

- Glória do Ribatejo e Granho
- Marinhais
- Muge
- Salvaterra de Magos e Foros de Salvaterra
