= Kenneth Tomlinson =

American journalist

Kenneth Y. Tomlinson (August 3, 1944 – May 1, 2014) was a journalist, editor at Reader's Digest and American government official. He was also chairman of the Broadcasting Board of Governors, which manages Voice of America radio, and Chairman of the Board of the Corporation for Public Broadcasting, which managed funds appropriated by Congress in support of public television and radio. According to The New York Times, there was an inquiry concerning possible misuse of federal money by Tomlinson. Investigators at the Corporation for Public Broadcasting said on November 15, 2005, "that they had uncovered evidence that its former chairman had repeatedly broken federal law and the organization's own regulations in a campaign to combat what he saw as liberal bias". According to The New York Times, U.S. State Department investigators determined in 2006 that he had "used his office to run a 'horse racing operation'," that he "improperly put a friend on the payroll", that he "repeatedly used government employees to perform personal errands", and that he "billed the government for more days of work than the rules permit".

Tomlinson was a board member of the Corporation for Public Broadcasting, and served as chairman from September 2003 to September 2005. During his time as chairman, he pursued aggressive policies of adding conservative viewpoints to programming supported by CPB funds. An internal investigation into his acts as chairman led to his resignation in November 2005.

== Biography ==
A native of Grayson County, Virginia, Tomlinson began his career in journalism working as a reporter for the Richmond Times-Dispatch in 1965. In 1968 he joined the Washington bureau of Reader's Digest. He was a correspondent in Vietnam, and co-authored the book P.O.W., a history of American prisoners of war during the Vietnam War. In 1977 and 1978, he worked out of the Digest's Paris bureau covering events in Europe, Africa, and the Middle East.

In 1975, Tomlinson married Rebecca Moore, a former congressional aide to Bill Stuckey and Sonny Montgomery. They were married for 39 years until Tomlinson's death in 2014; Mrs. Tomlinson died in 2015. They have two sons: William M. Tomlinson, 2000 graduate of Vanderbilt University and producer for CBS News Interactive; and Lucas Y. Tomlinson, a 2001 graduate of the United States Naval Academy and currently working as the Pentagon and State Department Producer for FOX News in Washington, D.C.

In September 1982, President Reagan nominated Tomlinson to be his fourth Director of the Voice of America (VOA), where he served through August 1984. Some Reagan Administration's changes to VOA, such as the advent of editorials extolling administration policy, stirred opposition and fears that the broadcasts could be seen as propaganda.

"Someone complained that your editorials sound just like Ronald Reagan," Mr. Tomlinson said, "and I said you're darn right and I'm proud of it. The editorials should reflect the viewpoint of the party in power."

In October 1986, President Reagan nominated Tomlinson to be the fourth chairman of the National Commission on Libraries and Information Science (NCLIS), where he served until May 1987.

In May 1987, President Reagan nominated Tomlinson to be a member of the Board for International Broadcasting (BIB) where he served until 1994 when the BIB was dissolved by the International Broadcasting Act of 1994 and replaced by the Broadcasting Board of Governors (BBG). Tomlinson became a close friend of Karl Rove while they served together on the BIB after President Bush nominated Rove to be a member of the BIB in 1989.

Following his work at VOA, Tomlinson returned to Reader's Digest as managing editor in 1984. He was named executive editor in 1985 and became editor-in-chief in 1989. Tomlinson was the Virginia Press Association's "Virginian of the Year" in 1994 and is a member of the Virginia Communications Hall of Fame. Tomlinson retired as editor-in-chief of Reader's Digest in 1996. After moving to Virginia soon after, Tomlinson was named president and director of the National Sporting Library in Middleburg, Virginia, in 1999.

Tomlinson died of melanoma on May 1, 2014 at a Virginia hospital.

== CPB tenure ==
Tomlinson was appointed as chairman of the CPB board by President George W. Bush, for a two-year term, in September 2003. He embarked upon a mission to purge CPB of what he perceived as "liberal bias". His efforts sparked complaints of political pressure. Broadcasting & Cable magazine wrote when Tomlinson "uses terms like 'fair and balanced' in talking about what PBS should be, it is understandably seen as code guaranteed to evoke charges of the 'Foxification' of PBS and raise alarm bells with liberals and moderates, as well as with viewers who just don't care about a political agenda at all".

Tomlinson commissioned a $10,000 study into Bill Moyers' PBS program, Now with Bill Moyers, without informing the board of the investigation. He also retained two Republican lobbyists to try to defeat a Congressional proposal that would have increased the representation of broadcasters on the board, again without informing the board of the contracts.

The inspector general's report issued November 15, 2005, said that Tomlinson appeared to have violated both the federal law and the corporation's own rules in raising $5 million to underwrite The Journal Editorial Report, a PBS program by the editorial board of the Wall Street Journal.

Tomlinson, in a statement distributed with the report, rejected its conclusions. He said that any suggestion that he violated his duties or the law "is malicious and irresponsible" and that the inspector general had opted "for politics over good judgment". "Unfortunately, the Inspector General's preconceived and unjustified findings will only help to maintain the status quo and other reformers will be discouraged from seeking change", said Tomlinson, who has repeatedly defended his decisions as part of an effort to restore balance to programming. "Regrettably, as a result, balance and objectivity will not come soon to elements of public broadcasting".

In April 2005, the contract of the former CPB president, Kathleen Cox, was not renewed. She was replaced by acting president Ken Feree, a Republican and former adviser to then-FCC chairman Michael Powell. Tomlinson resigned from the CPB board on November 4, 2005, after the board saw the report about his tenure by the Inspector General of the CPB, requested by House Democrats. The report described possible political influence on personnel decisions, including e-mail correspondence between Tomlinson and the White House which indicated that Tomlinson "was strongly motivated by political considerations in filling the president/CEO position", a position eventually filled by former Republican National Committee co-chair Patricia Harrison. Harrison remains CPB president and CEO as of 2022. Tomlinson was replaced by Cheryl Halpern.

== Broadcasting Board of Governors tenure ==
In July 2005, the State Department opened an inquiry into Tomlinson's work at the Broadcasting Board of Governors, after Representative Howard L. Berman, Representative Tom Lantos and Senator Christopher Dodd forwarded accusations of misuse of money from an employee at the board.

The New York Times reported that the inquiry was pursuing accusations that Tomlinson had spent federal money for personal purposes and hired unqualified and ghost employees. It also reported that State Department investigators had seized records and e-mail from the board, including correspondence between Tomlinson and Karl Rove, one of President George W. Bush's senior advisors. Rove, an old friend of Tomlinson's, helped to secure Tomlinson's position as chairman.

A summary of the report, prepared by the inspector general of the State Department, was released by Berman on August 29, 2006. Berman asked that Tomlinson be removed from his position immediately in the light of the reports findings.

In the statement issued through his lawyer, Tomlinson said that he was "proud of what I have accomplished for U.S. international broadcasting" and that the investigation "was inspired by partisan divisions inside the Broadcasting Board of Governors". He implied that it was more efficient for him to work for the Corporation for Public Broadcasting at his office at the Broadcasting Board. About his horse racing work, he said the inspector general had concluded that it amounted to "an average of one e-mail and two and a half minutes a day" at the office.

He also said he spent more time on broadcasting responsibilities at his farm and residences than he spent on his horses at the office. In early September 2006, the BBG appointees voted on two resolutions related to the inspector general's report: whether to call for Tomlinson's resignation, and whether to sharply curtail his authority. Both resolutions failed in votes that split along party lines.

Tomlinson continued to serve on the Broadcasting Board of Governors until 2007.
