= Cultural impact of Mariah Carey =

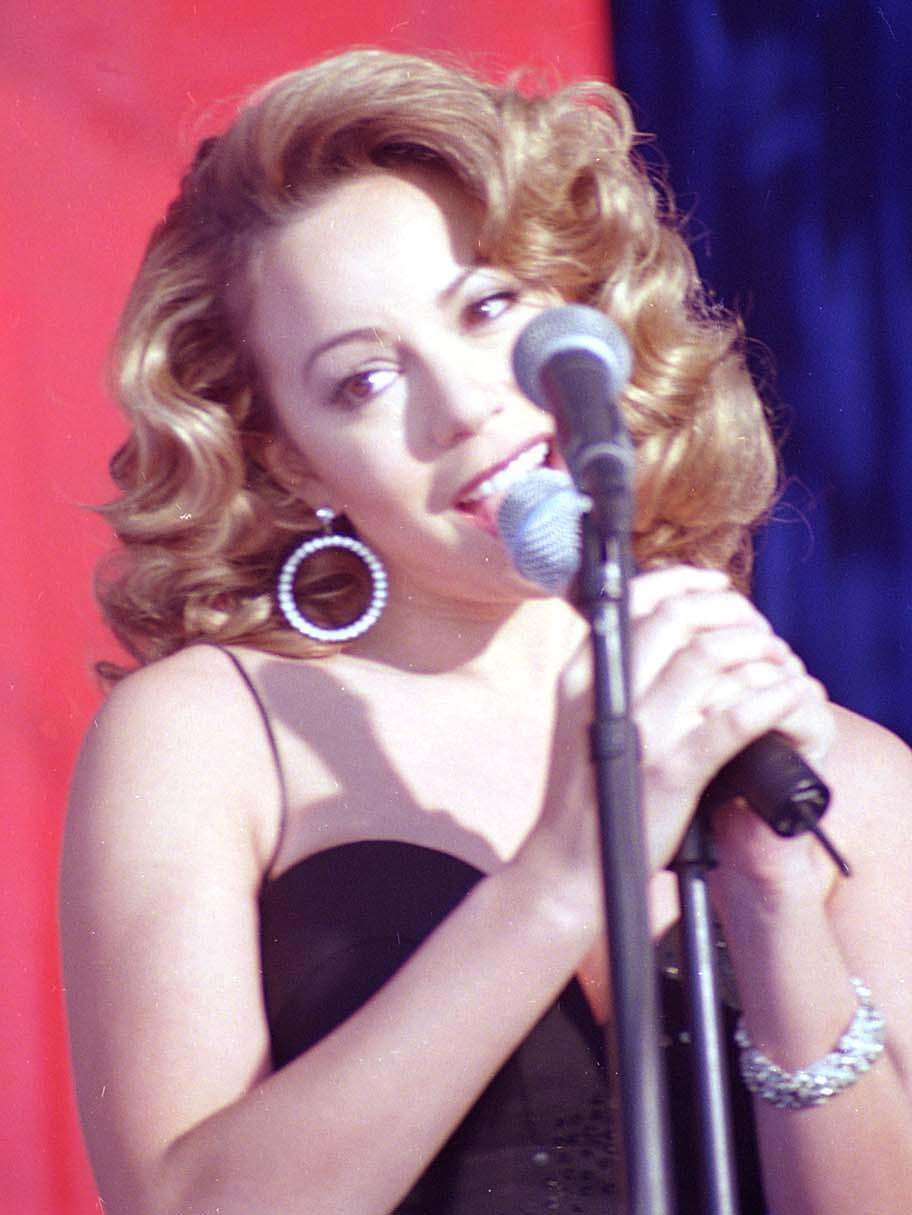
Mariah Carey shooting her music video for "I Still Believe" at Edwards Air Force Base in 1998

Mariah Carey has affected popular culture and the music industry in various ways. Her rise to success as a multiracial American helped break barriers in the music industry and in popular culture; media scrutiny and her public responses facilitated emerging public conversations about multiracialism and representation.

Carey is credited with revolutionizing the usage of distinguished vocal stylings such as melisma and the whistle register. She is also credited for and was among the first artists to merge hip-hop with pop through her collaborations and remixes, notably with "Fantasy" featuring Ol' Dirty Bastard. Her career, noted for its longevity, has influenced and inspired artists on American Idol and worldwide. Her music has been recorded, performed, and sampled by various acts. She has received several honors and tributes including a star on the Hollywood Walk of Fame, Billboard's Icon Award, and the Grammy Global Impact Award.

Carey has been commercially successful. In the United States, she has broken several Billboard records, including most number-one singles by a solo artist (19), and has spent a record 101 weeks atop the Billboard Hot 100. She has also broken records internationally, and is the best-selling Western artist in Japan. Dubbed the "Queen of Christmas" and a holiday icon, Carey has broken several physical and streaming records with her Christmas music, particularly with the song "All I Want for Christmas Is You", which has been called one of the greatest holiday songs of all time, and her 1994 album Merry Christmas, one of the best-selling Christmas albums of all time.

== Fame and stardom ==
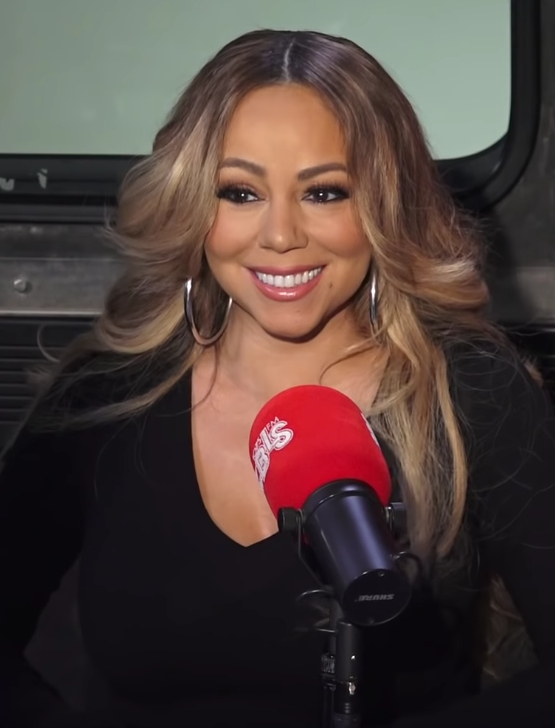
Carey talking on a podcast in 2018

One of the best-selling music artists of all time, Carey has released 16 studio albums and dozens of singles. She has been ranked and featured on various lists of great singers. (Note: Including Rolling Stone, MTV, and Consequence of Sound.) A 2003 MTV2 online poll named her the best singer of the past twenty years, a result Carey called an "enormous compliment".

Forbes writer Hugh McIntyre wrote that during the 1990s and 2000s, Carey was "the biggest musical star in the world", noting her "talent, fame and powerful vocals". In 2014, Time named Carey the "ultimate pop star" and ranked her atop their "ultimate pop stardom" list. The New Republic writer Jo Livingstone opined that Carey became "one of the most enduring stars of our time, laying the blueprint for a generation of young singers". Rolling Stone called Carey the "architect of modern pop".

Carey has been praised by various journalists for her career longevity. In 2019, Anne Branigin from The Root commented that "there's longevity, then there's Mariah Carey". Revolt writer Lauren Williams referred to Carey as the "blueprint for longevity" stating that "very few singers can hold a candle to [her]". Williams went on to say that Carey's "record-breaking career makes her one of the most decorated artists of all time". When reviewing her fifteenth studio album, Caution, Eddino Hadi wrote, "In the last three decades since she made her debut, many female pop stars have scaled the heights that Carey has reached but very, very few have matched her longevity".

=== Cultural honors ===
At the end of the 1990s, Carey was recognised as the best-selling act of the decade by numerous organisations and award shows including Billboard, American Music Awards, and the World Music Awards with the latter also naming her the "Best Selling Female Artist of the Millennium". In 2008, Carey was inducted into The Long Island Music and Entertainment Hall of Fame, and also received a special achievement award by the American Music Awards and World Music Awards for having the most number-one singles in the US for a solo artist. In 2012, Carey was honoured at The BET Honors. That same year, Carey was ranked second on VH1's list of the "100 Greatest Women in Music".

In 2015, Carey was honored with a star on the Hollywood Walk of Fame. That year Billboard also ranked Carey at number five on the Billboard Hot 100 All-Time Top Artists, making Carey the second most successful female artist in the history of the chart. At the end of the 2010s, Billboard ranked Carey at number four on their "Top 125 Artists of All Time" chart making her the top female act. In 2019, Carey received the Billboard Icon Award, and was honoured at Variety's Power of Women event. In 2022, Carey was inducted into the Songwriters Hall of Fame. In 2024, Carey received the Grammy Global Impact Award, while in 2025 she received the Michael Jackson Video Vanguard Award at the 2025 MTV Video Music Awards.

=== Tributes and references ===
Carey and her work has been paid tribute to numerous times. In 2012 and 2023, American singer Patti LaBelle paid tribute to Carey covering "Hero" and "Love Takes Time" respectively. Other artists who have performed a tribute to Carey includes Tori Kelly, Muni Long, Jennifer Hudson, and Kelly Rowland. In 2026, Carey was honored as MusiCares' Person of the Year, where a range of tributes were performed by artists including the Foo Fighters, Laufey and Kesha, among multiple others. Carey's album cover outfits have often been paid tribute to by various artists including British singer Leigh-Anne Pinnock recreating Carey's look from the cover of The Emancipation of Mimi for the artwork of her single "Don't Say Love", and American rapper Latto recreating the Rainbow album cover for Halloween.

The 2019 film Always Be My Maybe was a play-on-words of Carey's 1996 single "Always Be My Baby", which was used as the movie's theme song. Carey and her signature Christmas song, "All I Want for Christmas Is You", were referenced in Marvel Studios' What If...? (2023) Christmas special episode "What If... Happy Hogan Saved Christmas?". Carey's "Fantasy" has notably been used in the films Rush Hour (1998) and Free Guy (2021). "Emotions" features in the fifth season of the Netflix series The Crown and in the second season of the television show Percy Jackson and the Olympians, where it is used as plot point to destroy a flock of Stymphalian birds. Carey has also been referred to in various songs, including "Hiss" by Megan Thee Stallion, "The Heart Part 6" by Drake, "Downtown" by Macklemore & Ryan Lewis, and "This Is How We Do" by Katy Perry.

== Racial barriers ==
Carey has been credited for her role in breaking down racial barriers in popular culture and facilitating public discourse surrounding multiracialism. Carey is biracial with a mother and father of Irish and African-American / Venezuelan descent respectively. Brittany Luse from Vulture noted that as a biracial pop-star Carey became the face or an "avatar" for biracial identity, adding that she became "a validating presence for some and a source of both curiosity and discomfort for others". Luse also added that Carey "rose to fame as public conversations about multiracial identity were expanding in the early '90s".

=== Multiracial challenges ===
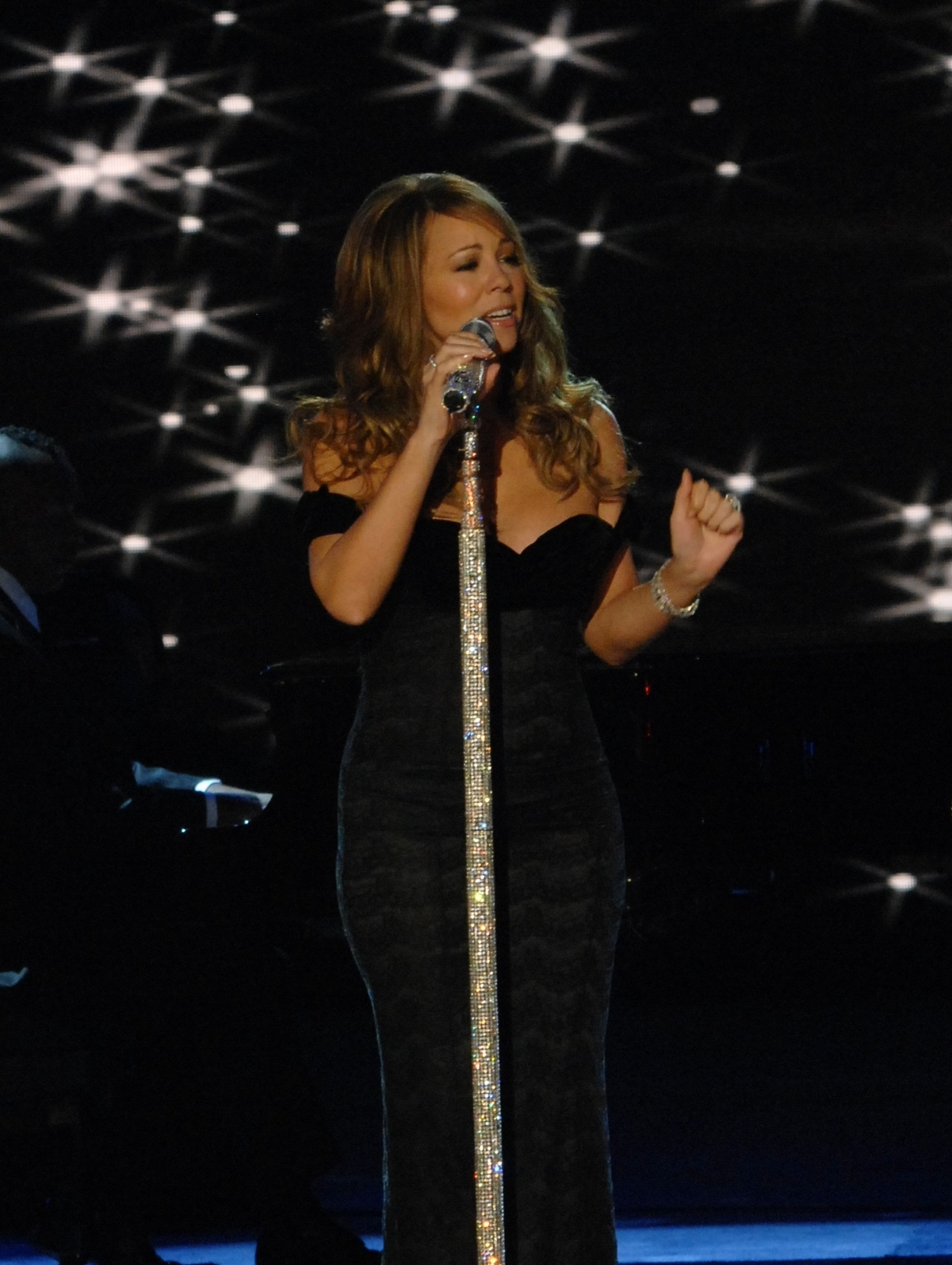
Carey in 2009 performing at the Neighborhood Ball for the first inauguration of Barack Obama, the United States' first multiracial President

Carey has often spoken about the challenges she faced in the industry as a multiracial artist. Today writer Ree Hines noted that music in the 1990s often segregated "white" and "black" music on the pop music and contemporary R&B charts respectively. Hines felt that due to this, Carey had to "forge ahead and create her own path to success". Carey herself noted that before hitting it big, she found it hard to be signed by a record label due to their lack of understanding when it came to her background. After signing with Columbia Records in 1988, the media was largely unaware of Carey's ethnic background, with articles describing her as a "white soul singer" and the "white girl who can sing", affecting Carey's insecurities. Carey also faced media scrutiny with articles often focusing on her racial background rather than her talent, leading to debates about her authenticity and cultural appropriation accusations. Carey began to assume ambiguity for her own protection.

In an article on how Carey overcame these racial barriers, Yahoo! News writer Jazmin Moore wrote that "the strife Carey confronted [...] only deepened her musical palette", which in turn made her successful. Carey has since often addressed these issues of race and identity throughout her interviews, sharing her experiences and raising awareness to the topic. On a podcast interview with Meghan, Duchess of Sussex, Carey discussed her multiracial heritage feeling that people have always wanted her to choose between being "black" or "white" woman.

=== Representation and impact ===
In her book Tragic No More: Mixed-Race Women and the Nexus of Sex and Celebrity, Caroline A. Streeter, an associate professor at the University of California, Los Angeles, described Carey as one of the "ideal figures through which to consider the post-Civil Rights era's apparent rehabilitation and transformation of the mulatto/a into a biracial subject of representation".

As a multiracial person, Carey's presence in the music industry has helped paved the way for others who share similar backgrounds, allowing the music industry to open its doors for conversations about race, representation and encouraging more inclusiveness. Luse quoted,

Carey's experience of fame could have happened only once; her stardom punched a hole in the sky. Her career matured as current conversations about mixed identity were still forming and while the passing narratives of the past, both brilliant and clumsy, had yet to fade from pop-cultural memory. There was a time when she might have been considered the most famous mixed person of Black and white parentage in America, but now the field's far more crowded.

In 1997, Carey released the ballad "Outside" from her sixth studio album Butterfly which covered Carey's experience being biracial and not belonging. Carey's 2020 memoir, The Meaning of Mariah Carey, has also been praised for its work as a conversation about "stories about the concealment, or the possibility of concealment, of one's Black parentage". Luse called it a "punctuation mark on a previous era" where being biracial was not understood by the general public. In 2021, Carey performed the theme song for the television sitcom Mixed-ish (2019) which followed the life of a biracial girl living in an American suburb in 1985.

== Musicianship ==
=== Vocal styles ===
==== Melisma ====
Carey's vocal style, as well as her singing ability, have significantly impacted music. Multiple media sources have referred to Carey as the "Queen of Melisma". According to Rolling Stone, "Her mastery of melisma, the fluttering strings of notes that decorate songs like "Vision of Love", inspired the entire American Idol vocal school, for better or worse, and virtually every other female R&B singer since the Nineties." In a review of her 2002 Greatest Hits album, Devon Powers of PopMatters called Carey a living legend and that she has since gone on to influence countless female vocalists with her melisma. Chart historian Tom Breihan from Stereogum, chose "Vision of Love" as one of the chapters in his book The Number Ones: Twenty Chart-Topping Hits That Reveal the History of Pop Music, stating that Carey "established melisma-heavy R&B as a powerful commercial force". Author Bruce Pollock said the song led "to a generation of aspiring belters from Beyoncé to Rihanna to Christina Aguilera".

In 2008, Jody Rosen of Slate wrote of Carey's influence in music industry, calling her the most influential vocalist of the last two decades and the person who made rococo melismatic singing. Rosen further exemplified Carey's influence by drawing a parallel to American Idol which to Rosen, "often played out as a clash of melisma-mad Mariah wannabes" adding that "nearly 20 years after Carey's debut, major labels continue to bet the farm on young stars such as the winner of Britain's X Factor show, Leona Lewis, with her Generation Next gloss on Mariah's big voice and big hair". New York magazine's editor Roger Deckker further commented that "Whitney Houston may have introduced melisma (the vocally acrobatic style of lending a word an extra syllable or twenty) to the charts, but it was Mariah—with her jaw-dropping range—who made it into America's default sound". Deckker also added that "every time you turn on American Idol, you are watching [Carey's] children". Professor Katherine L. Meizel noted in her book, The Mediation of Identity Politics in American Idol, that "Carey's influence [is] in the emulation of melisma or her singing amongst the wannabes, it's also her persona, her diva, her stardom which inspires them".

==== Whistle register ====
Carey possesses a five-octave vocal range, and is known for popularizing the use of whistle register in popular music. Carey gained the honorific nickname "Songbird Supreme" by various critics, The Recording Academy, and Guinness World Records due to her ability to sing in the whistle register. She first incorporated whistle notes in her debut album on various songs including "Vision of Love", garnering positive reviews. She became well known for her 1991 song, "Emotions" which heavily incorporated Carey singing in her whistle register. TheThings writer Michael Ibrahim noted that Carey "is easily the first person who comes to mind when high notes". American singer-songwriter Ariana Grande began to receive heavy comparisons to Carey after using the whistle register in her song "The Way".

=== Popularizing remixes ===
Mariah went further than her peers, treating remixes not as an occasional indulgence but as a centerpiece of her art. To understand her stature as a remix queen, it's important to know how unusual it was for one of the busiest pop stars in the world to rewrite melodies and record all-new vocals for so many of her songs. Mariah handles her remixes as a great interpreter might approach a cover of someone else's composition.

— Paste writer Andrew Chan, analysing Carey's remixes.

Carey is recognised for the remixes she releases of her singles, and has been called the "Queen of Remixes" by multiple media sources. (Note: Include MTV News, VH1, Slant Magazine, and Paste.) Princess Gabbara of MTV News wrote that it is "no secret that [Carey] goes to great lengths to deliver a spectacular remix, often re-recording vocals, penning new lyrics, shooting new music videos, and recording different versions to satisfy pop, R&B, hip-hop, and EDM audiences".

Carey has since helped popularize rappers as a featured act in the pop music genre, particularly with the remix of "Fantasy" and other post-1995 remixes. Judnick Mayard, writing for The Fader, noted that Carey was the main champion of the "R&B and hip-hop collaboration" movement. In 1995, after the success of Carey's song "Fantasy", a remix featuring rapper Ol' Dirty Bastard was released to polarizing responses. The remix has gone on to retrospectively receive positive acclaim with Mayard adding that "To this day Ol' Dirty Bastard and [Carey] may still be the best and most random hip hop collaboration of all time", adding that due to the remix of "Fantasy", "R&B and hip-hop were the best of step siblings."

Sasha Frere-Jones, editor of The New Yorker commented that because of Carey, "it became standard for R&B/hip-hop stars like Missy Elliott and Beyoncé, to combine melodies with rapped verses. And young white pop stars—including Britney Spears, 'N Sync and Christina Aguilera—have spent much of the past ten years making pop music that is unmistakably R&B". She concluded that "[Carey's] idea of pairing a female songbird with the leading male MCs of hip-hop changed R&B and, eventually, all of pop. Kelefa Sanneh of The New York Times also noted that, "in the mid-1990s [Carey] pioneered a subgenre that some people call the thug-love duet", writing that in 2005, "clean-cut pop stars are expected to collaborate with roughneck rappers". Slant writers Sal Cinquemani and Eric Henderson opined that "Carey is the quintessential crossover artist, with a catalog of hits that bridges the gap between pop, R&B, hip-hop, and house music".

=== Holiday music ===
Carey has also been credited with popularizing the release of holiday music at a career peak. In October 1994, when Billboard first announced that she would be releasing a Christmas album, critics were initially shocked. Carey herself retrospectively admitted to be "a little bit apprehensive", adding that she "was very young and was just starting out and felt like people do Christmas albums later in their lives". Following the album's success, numerous artists began to embrace releasing holiday music at the peak of their careers. Some prime examples include Kelly Clarkson's "Underneath the Tree" (2013) and Ariana Grande's "Santa Tell Me" (2014) which both received wide comparisons to Carey's "All I Want for Christmas Is You" and became the only two 21st-century Christmas songs to reach top ten on the Hot 100.

== Commercial success ==
=== Domestic ===
==== Billboard records ====
Carey has set and broken numerous Hot 100 records. She has topped the Billboard Hot 100 for 100 weeks, the most for any artist in US chart history. On that same chart, she has accumulated 19 number-one singles. (Note: These include: "Vision of Love", "Love Takes Time", "Someday", "I Don't Wanna Cry", "Emotions", "I'll Be There", "Dreamlover", "Hero", "Fantasy", "One Sweet Day" (with Boyz II Men), "Always Be My Baby", "Honey", "My All", "Heartbreaker", "Thank God I Found You", "We Belong Together", "Don't Forget About Us", "Touch My Body" and "All I Want for Christmas Is You".) the most for any solo artist (second behind the Beatles). She is the only artist to have a number-one song in each year of a decade (1990s decade) and the only act whose first five singles all reached the summit of the chart. In 2020, Carey became the first solo artist to top the Billboard Hot 100 over four decades (1990s–2020s). Carey was the first woman to debut at number-one in the United States (second overall after Michael Jackson), with "Fantasy", and the first act to debut at number-one multiple times after "One Sweet Day" and "Honey" also debuted at the top spot. She held the record for the most number-one debuts, until surpassed by Ariana Grande in 2020.

"One Sweet Day" spent sixteen consecutive weeks at the top of the Hot 100 in 1996, setting the record for the most weeks atop the chart until surpassed in 2019 by "Old Town Road". Carey later reclaimed this record with "All I Want for Christmas is You" in 2025. She also scored the longest-running number-one song of the 1990s, 2000s and 2020s—with "One Sweet Day" (16 weeks), "We Belong Together" (14 weeks) and "All I Want for Christmas Is You" (20 weeks), respectively— and became the first female artist (third overall after Boyz II Men and Drake) to have three songs spend at least ten weeks atop the chart. Both "One Sweet Day" and "We Belong Together" became the best performing songs of their respective decades, making Carey the only act to accomplish the feat twice. She also holds the records for the most cumulative years (22 years) and the most consecutive years (11 years) topping the chart. In 1991, Carey became the second woman to have writing credits on three number-one songs in one calendar year ("Someday", "I Don't Wanna Cry" and "Emotions"). In 2005, she became the first woman to solely occupy the top two positions of the chart, with "We Belong Together" and "Shake It Off".

"All I Want for Christmas Is You" alone has broken multiple Billboard records and was ranked by the magazine as the greatest holiday song of all time. It is the longest running number-one song on the Billboard Holiday 100, the Billboard Hot 100 and the Billboard Global 200. It also holds the record for the longest span of a song's first and last week at the summit of the Hot 100, a record that's annually extended, and the only song to return to number-one in more than two separate chart runs. (Note: The song has reached the top of the Hot 100 every year since 2019, making it the first song to top the Hot 100 in five distinct runs.) With the song, Carey became the first artist to reach number-one on the Billboard Hot 100 in the physical, digital, and streaming eras.

In 2008, Billboard listed "We Belong Together" as the ninth all-time top song on the Hot 100, and second of their list of R&B songs on the same chart. On November 19, 2010, Billboard magazine ranked Carey at number four on their "Top 50 R&B/Hip-Hop Artists of the Past 25 Years" chart.

==== Other achievements ====
As of March 2022, the Recording Industry Association of America (RIAA) lists Carey as the best-selling female albums artist, with shipments of 76 million units in the US, and one of the best-selling digital singles artists. She is the second female singer to amass both diamond-certified albums and singles, with the albums Music Box, Merry Christmas and Daydream, and the single "All I Want for Christmas Is You". With respective sales of over 32 million and 27 million copies worldwide, Music Box and Daydream rank among the best-selling albums of all time. With her debut album and The Emancipation of Mimi being the best-selling albums of the year in the US in 1991 and 2005, respectively, Carey became the second woman after Whitney Houston to achieve that feat. In 2021, The Emancipation of Mimi and "Fantasy" were included on the new editions of Rolling Stone magazine's lists of "The 500 Greatest Albums of All Time" and "The 500 Greatest Songs of All Time", respectively.

=== International ===
Carey has also experienced success internationally. She is the best-selling Western artist in Japan selling over 14.5 million records. Her #1's compilation album was certified with a triple-Million award from the Recording Industry Association of Japan and holds the record as the best-selling international album in the country; Music Box, Daydream, Butterfly and Merry Christmas have all sold over 2 million copies in the country, with the latter being the fourth-best-selling international album. Her song "All I Want for Christmas Is You" is also the third-best-selling song by a non-Asian artist. In 2018, Sony Music Asia–Pacific presented Carey with a certificate of achievement for 1.6 billion sales units in Asia–Pacific.

After its inclusion in a popular telenovela, Viver a Vida, Carey's cover of Foreigner's "I Want to Know What Love Is" broke the record for the longest-running number-one song on the Brasil Hot 100, which spent 27 weeks atop the chart.

=== Holiday achievements ===
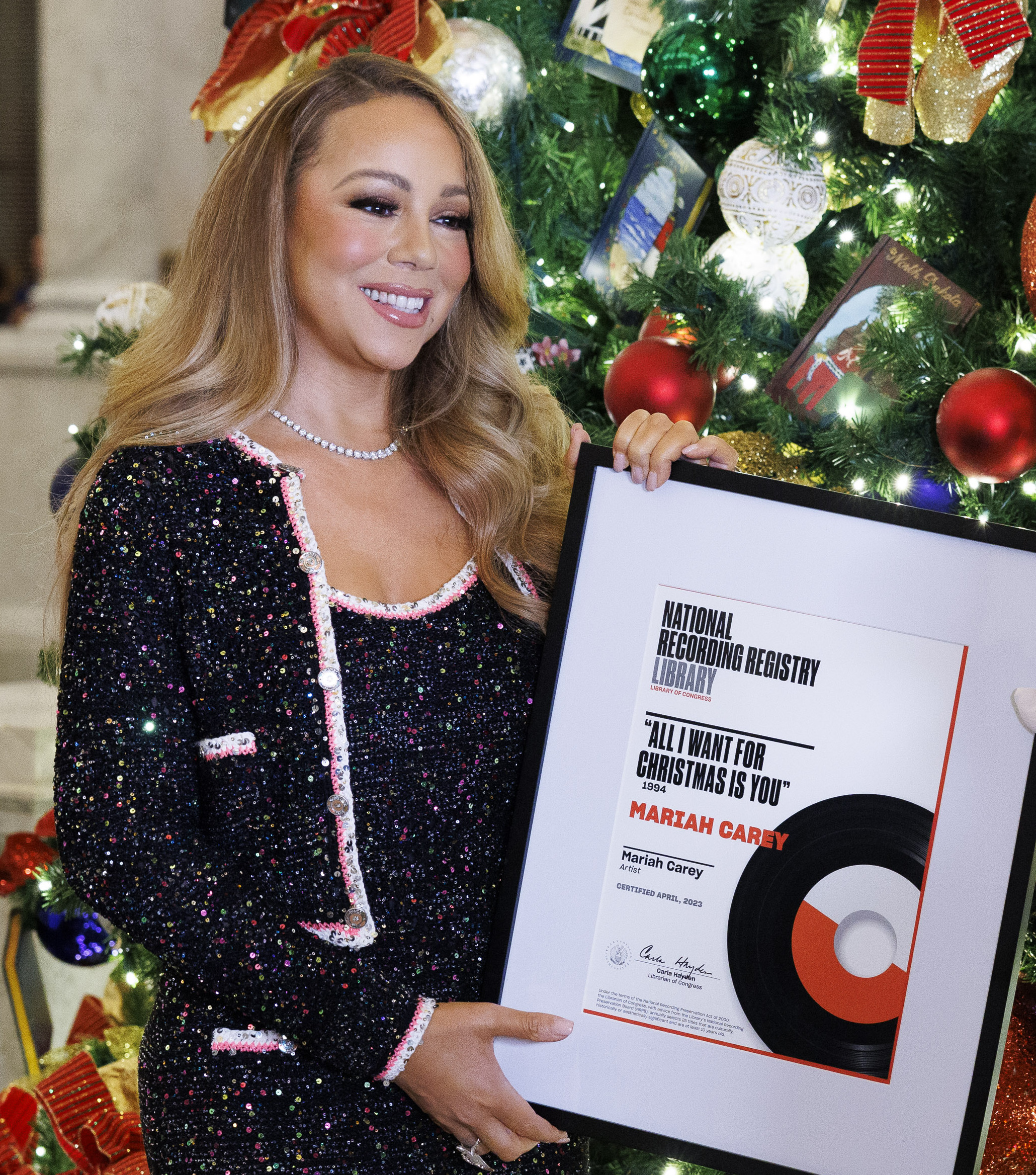
Carey being presented with a certificate honoring her induction into the Library of Congress for her song "All I Want for Christmas Is You" in 2023

Carey's holiday album Merry Christmas has sold over 18 million copies worldwide, and is one of the best-selling Christmas album of all time. In 2018, Carey became the first artist to replace herself at the number one spot on Billboard's Top R&B Albums chart, with Caution being replaced by Merry Christmas.

The album's lead single, "All I Want for Christmas Is You", became the first holiday song to be certified Diamond by the RIAA, and the only holiday ringtone to reach multi-platinum status in the US. With sales of over 20 million copies worldwide, it is one of the best-selling physical singles in music history and the best-selling holiday song by a female artist. It is also the highest-certified and the longest-charting song by a woman in the UK. On November 24, 2019, the song won three Guinness World Records. In 2023, the song was selected by the Library of Congress for preservation in the National Recording Registry, due to its "cultural, historical and aesthetic importance" in the American soundscape.

In 2021, the song earned one billion streams on Spotify, making it both Carey's first song and the first holiday song overall to do so. On December 25, 2023, it broke the record for the most Spotify streams in a single day (over 23 million plays), originally held by herself with the same song (21 million). The record was eventually beaten in 2024 by Taylor Swift's "Fortnight". Carey previously claimed the record for most daily Spotify streams in 2017 (10.8 million), in 2018 (10.82 million), and again in 2019 (12 million). In December 2024, the song surpassed two billions streams. It ranks among the 100 most streamed songs in Spotify's history. That same month, Carey became the eighth artist in history to surpass 100 million monthly listeners on the platform.

== Creative inspiration ==
=== Influence ===
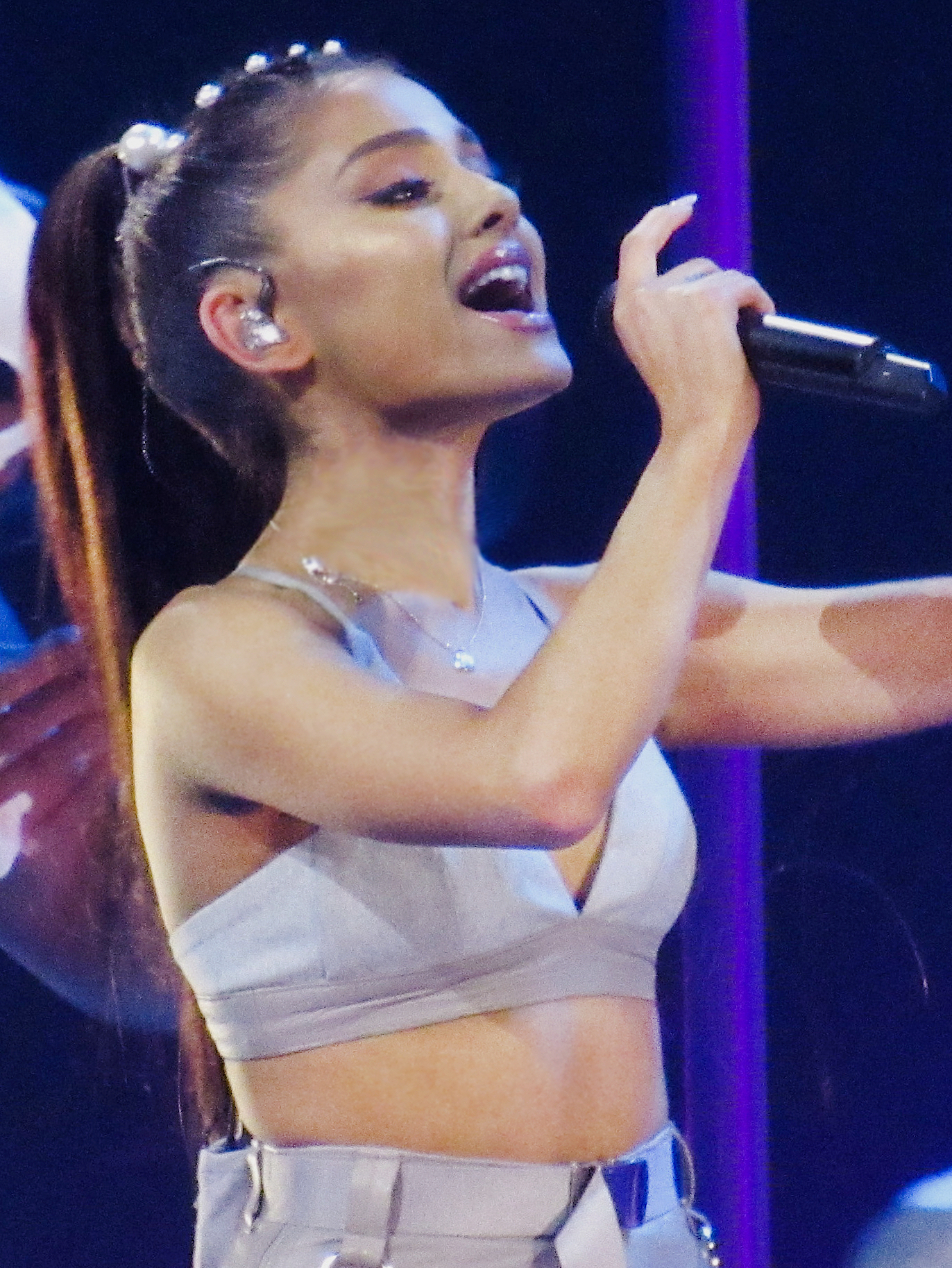
Ariana Grande

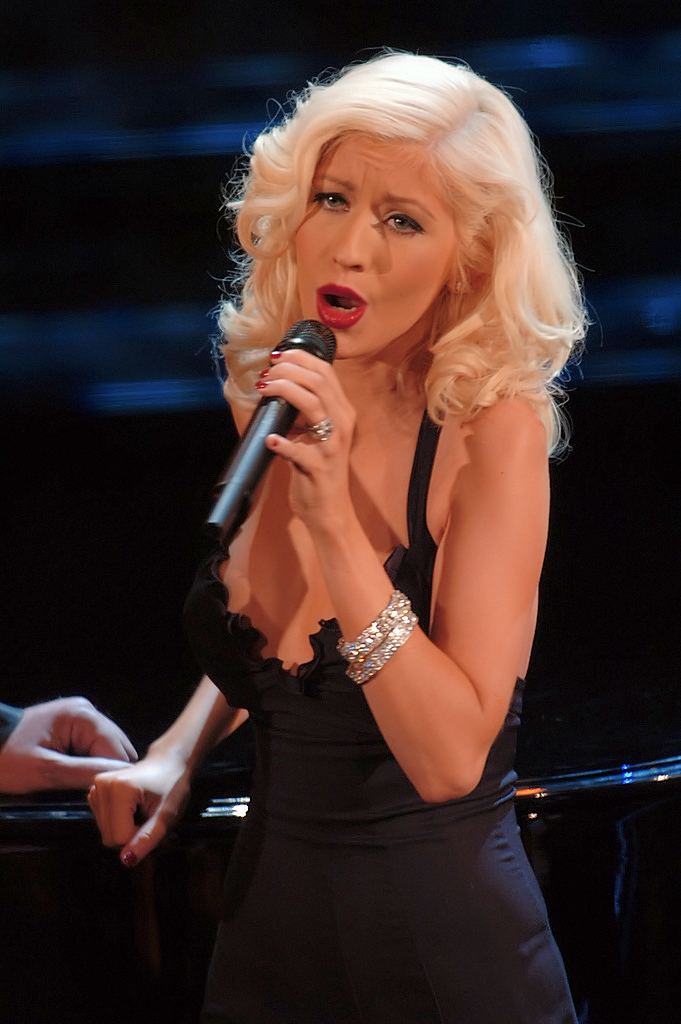
Christina Aguilera

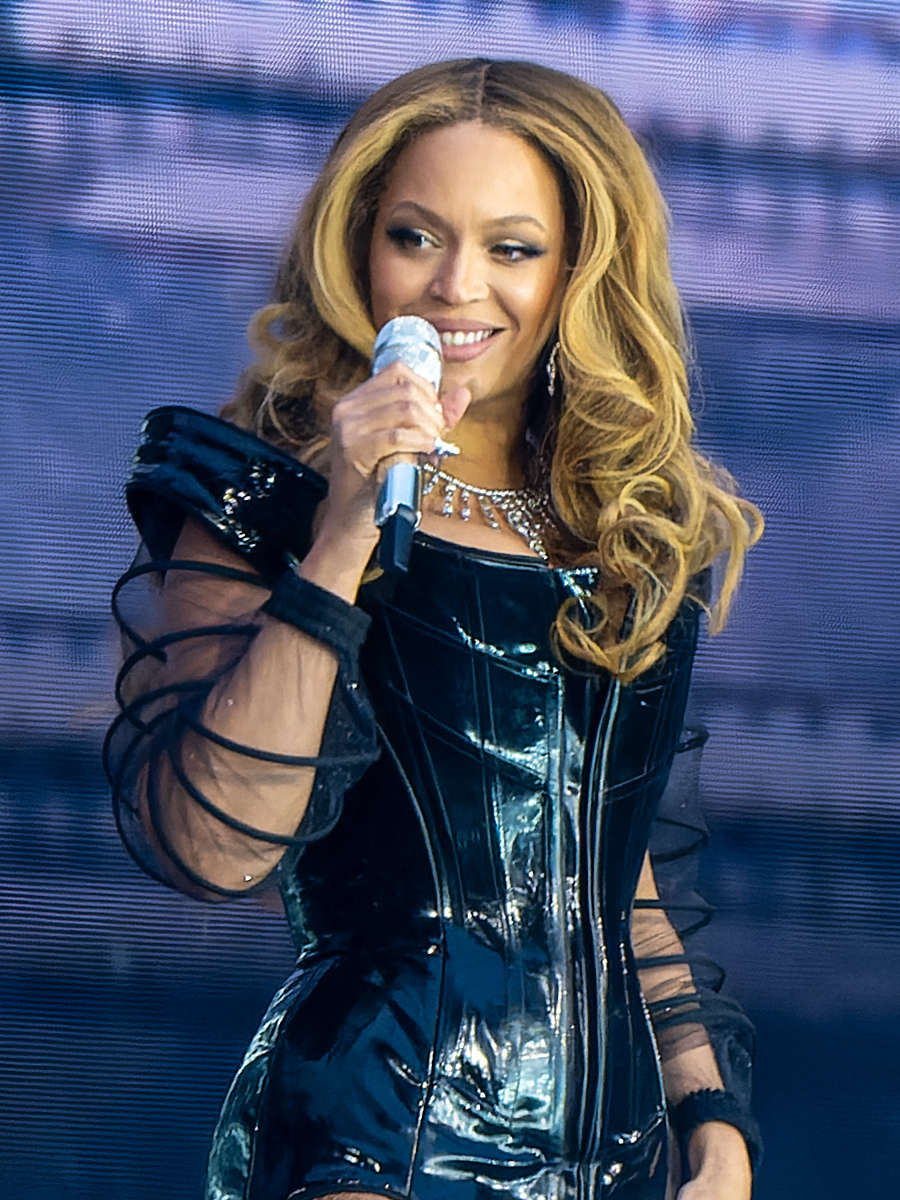
Beyoncé

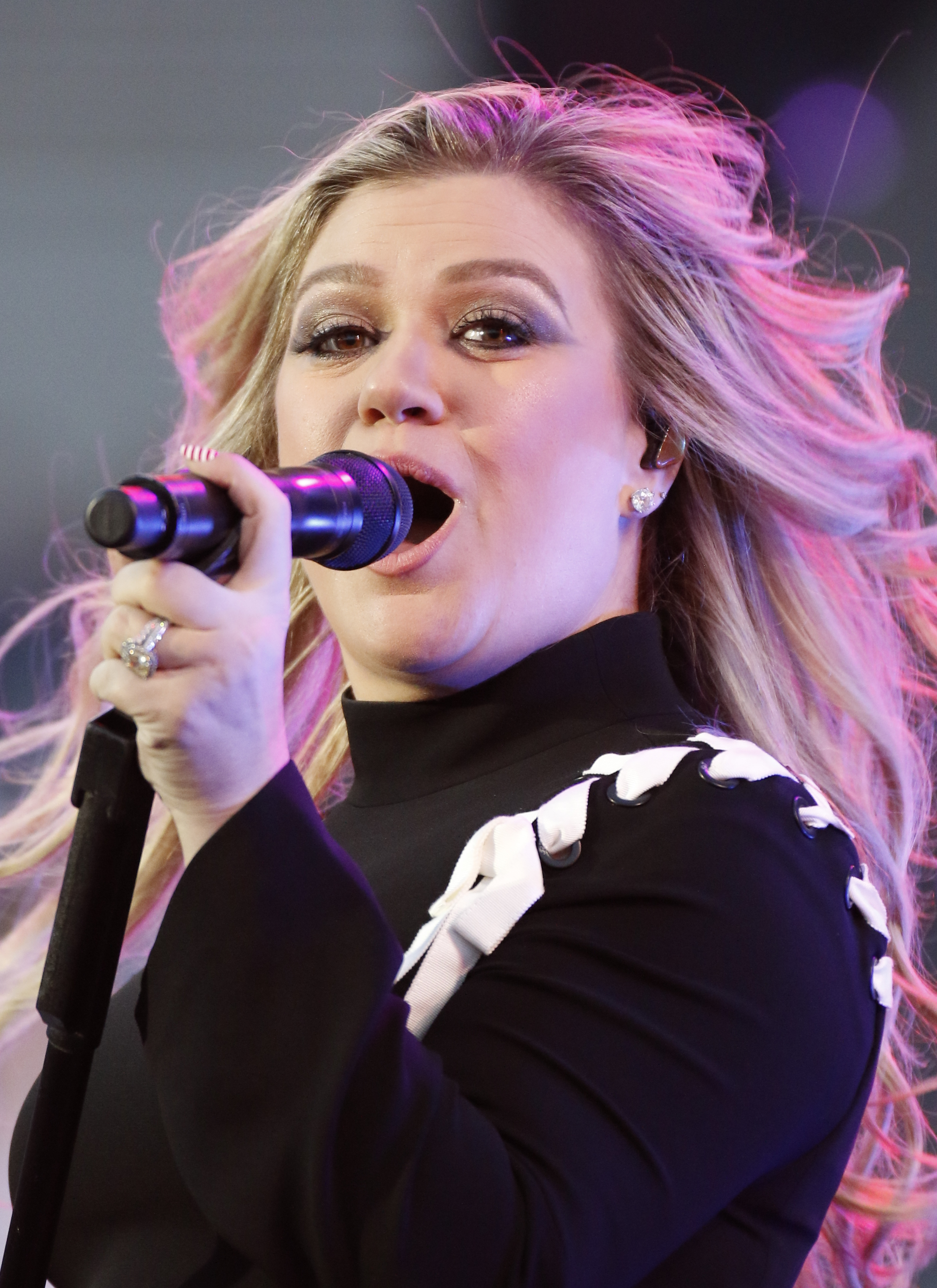
Kelly Clarkson

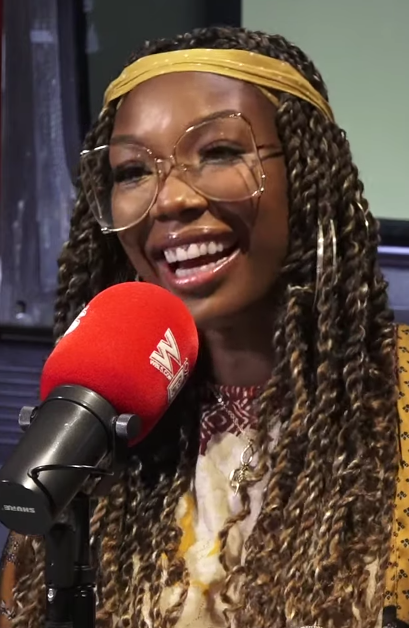
Brandy Norwood

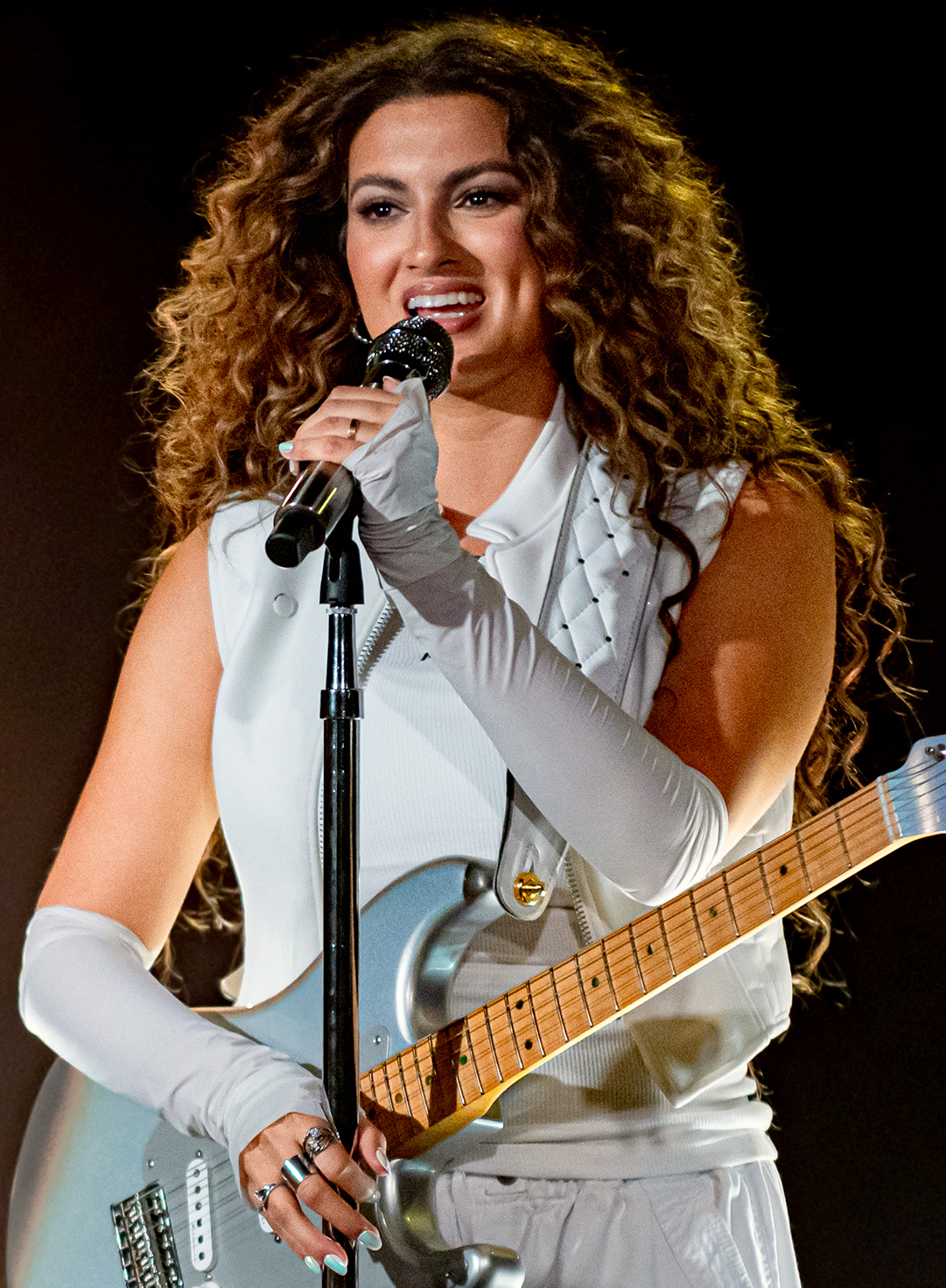
Tori Kelly

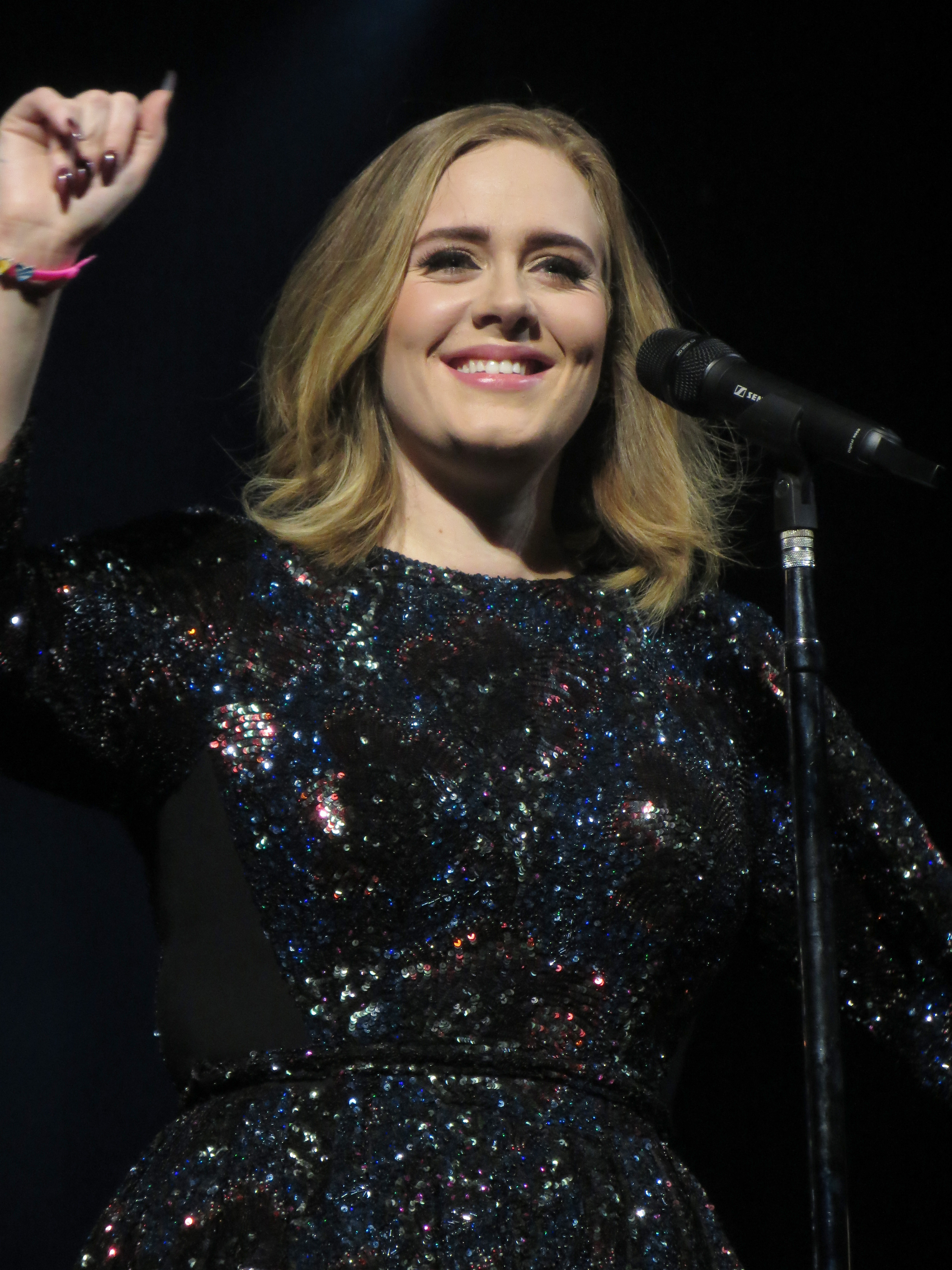
Adele

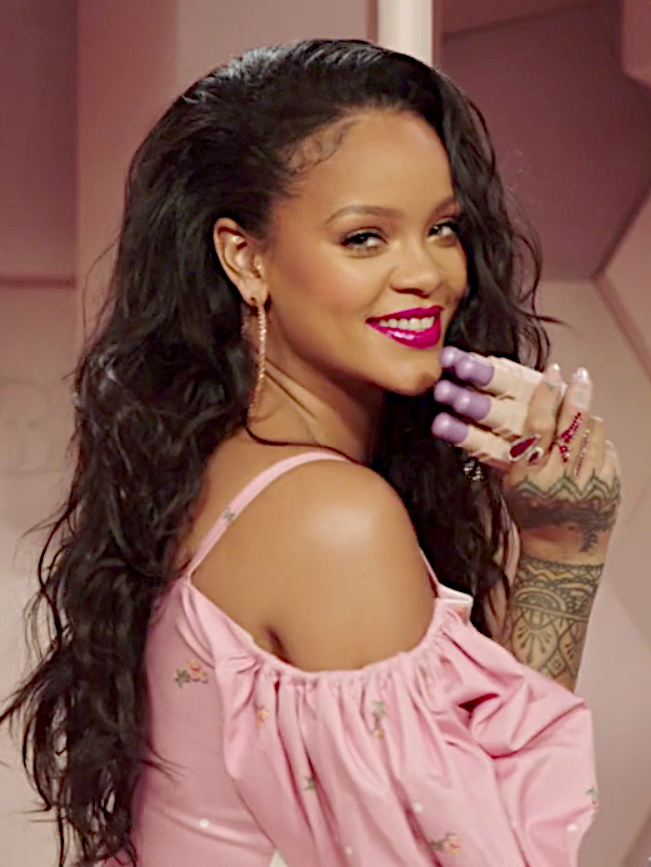
Rihanna

Several artists have cited Carey as an influence including those pictured above.

Throughout her career, Carey has inspired numerous singers and songwriters in the music industries all over the world. Music critic G. Brown from The Denver Post wrote that Carey's "five-octave range and melismatic style have influenced a generation of pop singers".

Various artists who have cited Carey as an influence include:

- Adele
- Aneeka
- Ari Lennox
- Ariana Grande
- Ava Max
- Beyoncé
- Brandy Norwood
- Bridgit Mendler
- Britney Spears
- Coco Jones
- Christina Aguilera
- Grimes
- Hikaru Utada
- Jake Zyrus
- Jennifer Hudson
- Jess Glynne
- Jessica Sanchez
- Jessica Simpson
- Jordin Sparks
- Justin Bieber
- Katy Perry
- Keke Palmer
- Kelela
- Kelly Rowland
- Kehlani
- Kelly Clarkson
- Kiana Ledé
- Lady Gaga
- Leona Lewis
- Mary J. Blige
- Megan Rochell
- Melanie Fiona
- Missy Elliott
- Morissette
- Muni Long
- Nelly Furtado
- Nicki Minaj
- Nina
- Normani
- Pink
- Regine Velasquez
- Rihanna
- Sabrina Carpenter
- Sam Smith
- Sandy
- Sarah Geronimo
- Snoop Dogg
- Thuy
- Tori Kelly
- Victoria Monét

Stevie Wonder, one of Carey's own influences, noted that "when people talk about the great influential singers, they talk about Aretha, Whitney and Mariah. That's a testament to [Carey's] talent and her range is that amazing". Singer Ariana Grande has cited Carey as one of her biggest inspirations, noting that her sound "was so influenced by [Carey] and the 1990s pop sound". On their 2024 collaboration "Yes, And", Grande cited Carey as "queen of [her] heart and lifelong inspiration". Beyoncé also credited Carey as the reason she wanted to "go pro", citing Carey's runs on "Vision of Love" as the catalyst. Christina Aguilera cited Carey as a vocal influence throughout her career, citing that she listened to Carey's debut album on repeat in the making of her 2002 album Stripped. Aguilera's ballad "I Will Be" was also heavily inspired by Carey's "Vanishing". Rihanna simiarily named Carey as a major influence on her music, saying that she would mimick everything Mariah did, and cited "Vision of Love" inspired her to pursue a career in music.

Tori Kelly cited Carey's 2005 album The Emancipation of Mimi as a "defining" moment for her, saying that, "Mariah had been Mariah at this point, so she didn't have anything to prove, but in my memory, this album was sort of a comeback for her. "We Belong Together" and "Shake It Off" came out and they were so fun, but then I dug into the album and there's songs on here that are so vocally challenging. I'll still put it on and see if I can hit some of the notes". American contemporary artist Deborah Roberts called the same album an inspiration for her 2018 exhibition, citing Carey's comeback during that era as a symbol of strength. Fellow Producer, musician, and American Idol judge Randy Jackson named Carey, along with Whitney Houston and Celine Dion as the voices of the modern generation. The trio have since been referred to as "The Vocal Trinity",

=== Covers and samples ===
Carey's music has been recorded and performed by a variety of artists. In 1994 and 2011, Aretha Franklin covered Carey's songs "Hero" and "Touch My Body" respectively. Other artists such as Luciano Pavarotti, Michael Ball, Natalie Bassingthwaighte and Rihanna have also covered "Hero". Being a Christmas standard, "All I Want for Christmas Is You" has also been covered by many artists including Dolly Parton, Elton John, Fifth Harmony, Red Hot Chili Peppers, and Shania Twain. Ariana Grande and Cynthia Erivo covered "When You Believe" at the 2024 Met Gala.

Carey's music has often been sampled by various acts. American singer Bryson Tiller interpolated Carey's "Shake It Off" on his debut single "Don't" in 2015. DJ Sigala sampled "Always Be My Baby" in 2016 for his song "Say You Do". Rapper Drake sampled "Emotions" on his song "Emotionless" from his album Scorpion (2018).
