= Patricia Harrison =

American public relations executive and government official (born 1939)

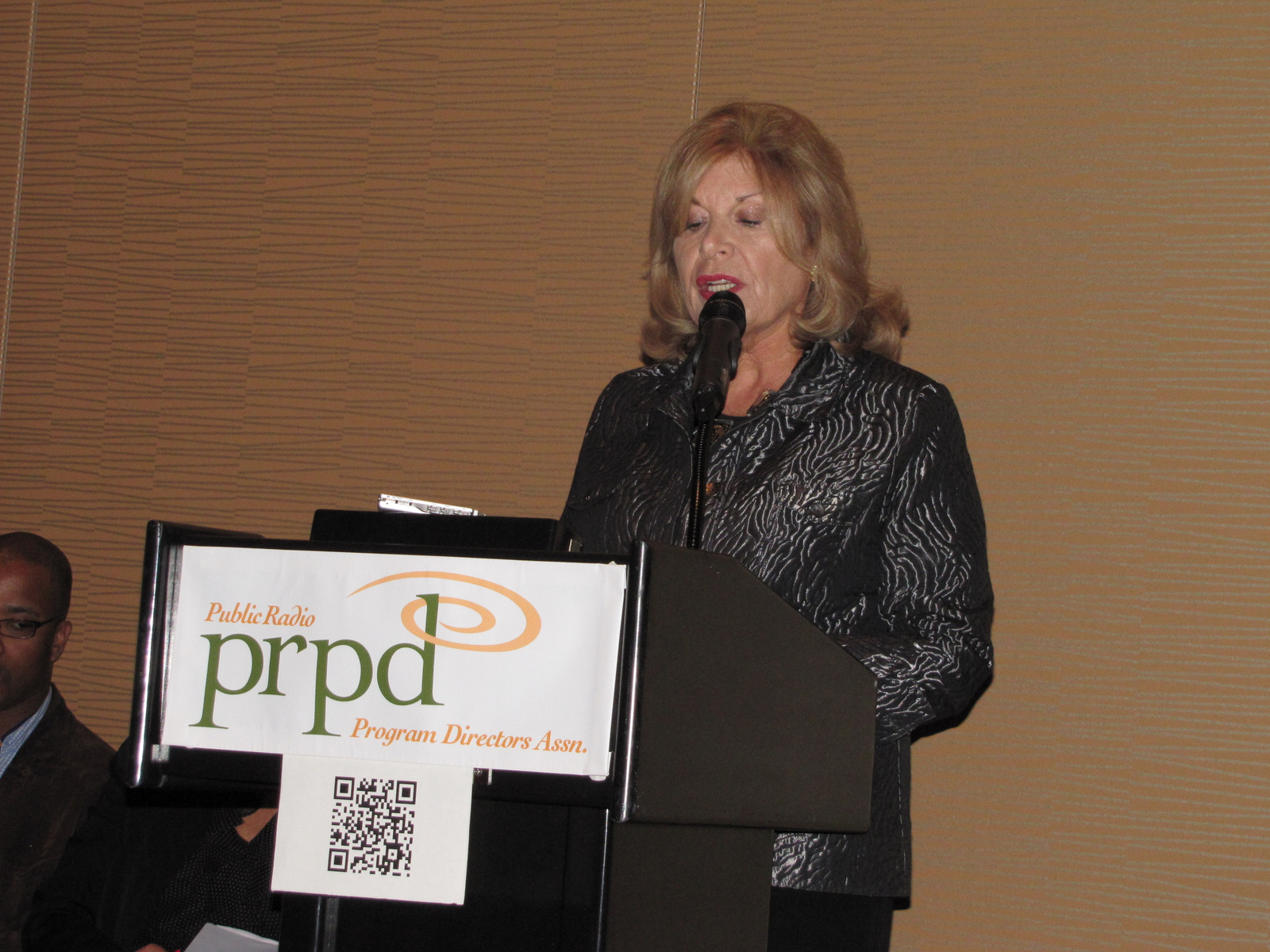
- Harrison speaking at the annual Public Radio Program Directors Conference in Baltimore, Maryland, September 2011

President and CEO of the Corporation for Public Broadcasting
- In office June 2005 – January 5, 2026
- Preceded by: Kathleen A. Cox

10th Assistant Secretary of State for Educational and Cultural Affairs
- In office October 2, 2001 – July 1, 2005
- President: George W. Bush
- Preceded by: William B. Bader
- Succeeded by: Dina Powell

Personal details
- Born: Patricia de Stacy Harrison; 1939 (age 86–87) Brooklyn, New York, U.S.
- Party: Republican
- Education: American University (BA)

Patricia de Stacy Harrison (born 1939) is an American public relations executive and government official. She formerly served as the president and chief executive officer of the Corporation for Public Broadcasting (CPB), a non-profit established by the federal government to support public radio and television broadcasting. The CPB was dissolved on January 5, 2026, under her executive leadership.

== Early life and education ==
Harrison is a native of Brooklyn, New York. She earned a bachelor's degree from the American University School of International Service in Washington, D.C.

== Career ==
In 1973 she co-founded a public relations agency with her husband, the E. Bruce Harrison Company, which was sold in a merger in 1996. According to her biography posted by the Bush administration, Harrison "created and directed programs in the public interest comprising diverse stakeholder groups, including the National Environmental Development Association, a partnership of labor, agriculture and industry working for better environmental solutions together."

In fact, the National Environmental Development Association was created as a pro-industry, anti-environmental regulation PR group, which worked closely with the American Petroleum Institute and others to promote climate change denial. The E. Bruce Harrison Company also designed the PR campaign for the Global Climate Coalition, the largest and most prominent industry advocate in international climate negotiations against climate action. E. Bruce Harrison Company's greatest success, according to journalist Jane McMullen, was in mounting industry opposition to the Kyoto Protocol and preventing the United States from ever ratifying it.

George H. W. Bush appointed Harrison to the President's Export Council in the United States Department of Commerce in 1990. She was elected co-chair of the Republican National Committee in 1997, serving until 2001, when she was appointed to the post of Assistant Secretary of State for Educational and Cultural Affairs by then-Secretary of State Colin Powell. Under Harrison's direction, the State Department initiated the CultureConnect program in which American celebrities including YoYo Ma, Denyce Graves, Doris Roberts and Frank McCourt acted as "cultural ambassadors" in trips to Pakistan, Russia, Israel, and other countries.

In June 2005, Harrison was appointed president and CEO of the Corporation for Public Broadcasting, despite allegations of bias and having no background or experience in broadcasting. Later that year, the process by which she was selected was called into question by a report from the Inspector General of the CPB. The report concluded that then-CPB chairman Kenneth Tomlinson "was strongly motivated by political considerations in filling the president/CEO position". Tomlinson resigned from the CPB board on November 4, 2005 and was replaced by Cheryl Halpern. Harrison is the CPB president and CEO as of January 2021. In 2015, Harrison gave public support to the work of the David Lynch Foundation.

On January 5, 2026, the CPB board of directors voted to dissolve the organization. Harrison described the closure as necessary to "protect the integrity of the public media system".

== Books ==
- Patricia Harrison (ed), America's New Women Entrepreneurs: Tips, Tactics, and Techniques of Women Achievers in Business, Acropolis Books, May 1986, ISBN 0-87491-810-3
- Patricia Harrison, Seat At The Table: An Insider's Guide for America's New Women Leaders, Mastermedia Publishing Company, February 1996, ISBN 1-57101-042-4

== Speeches ==
- Patricia Harrison, Assistant Secretary of State for Educational and Cultural Affairs, "The Role of International Education in the Struggle Against Terrorism", U.S. Department of State, November 25, 2003
- Pat Harrison, "Ask the White House", The White House, March 12, 2004

Government offices
Preceded by William B. Bader	Assistant Secretary of State for Educational and Cultural Affairs; October 2, 2001 – July 1, 2005	Succeeded by Dina Powell
