= Middle East Broadcasting Networks =

US Arabic-language media organization

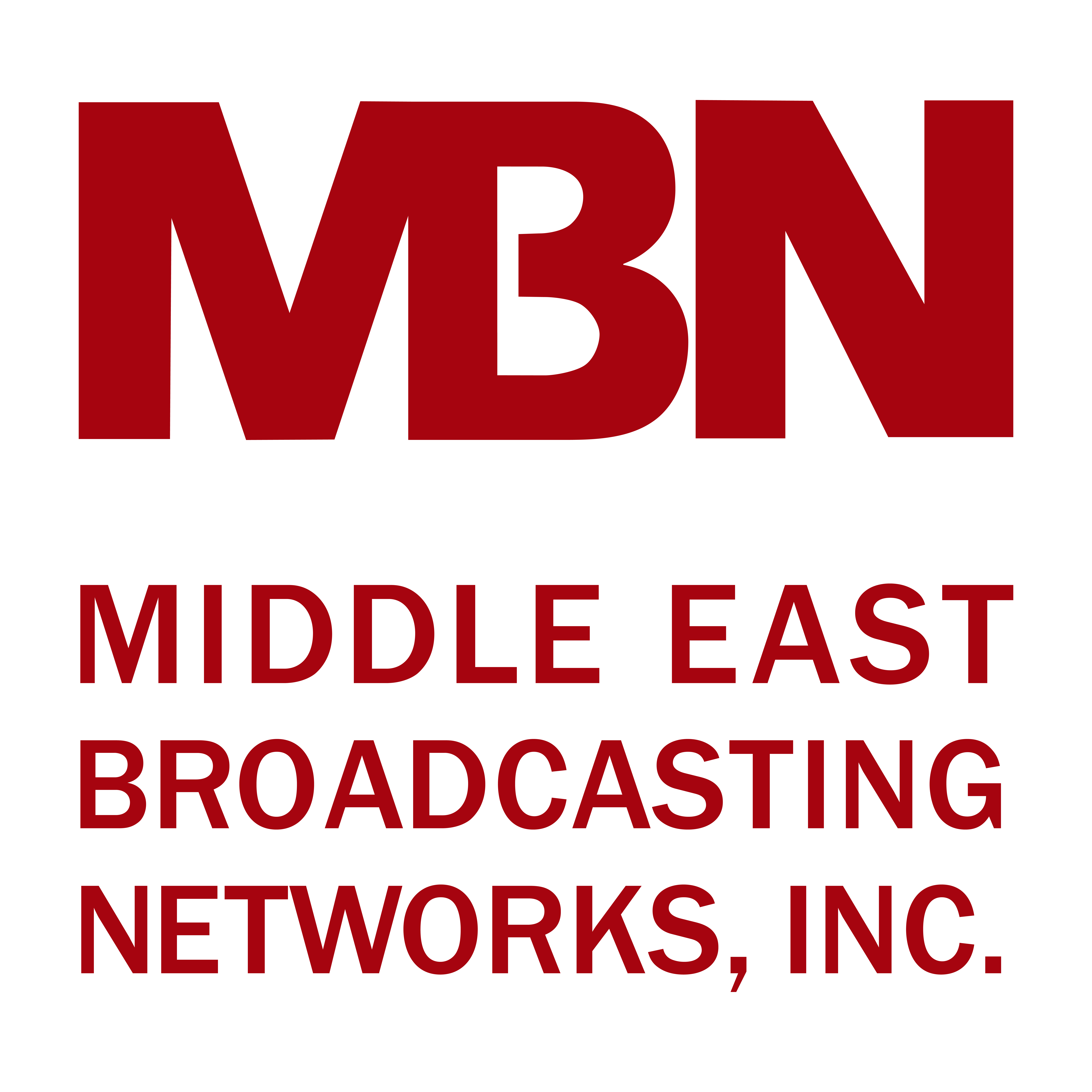
- Abbreviation: MBN
- Formation: February 14, 2004; 22 years ago
- Type: 501(c)(3) organization
- Tax ID no.: 42-1591205
- Headquarters: Newington, Virginia
- Subsidiaries: Alhurra, Radio Sawa
- Budget: Funded by the U.S. Agency for Global Media (USAGM), which oversees all U.S. Government funded foreign broadcasts.
- Website: www.usagm.gov/networks/mbn/
- Remarks: Available in 22 countries and territories across the Middle East and North Africa, including Algeria, Bahrain, Djibouti, Egypt, Iraq, Jordan, Kuwait, Lebanon, Libya, Mauritania, Morocco, Oman, State of Palestine, Qatar, Saudi Arabia, Somalia, Sudan, Syria, Tunisia, United Arab Emirates, and Yemen.

The Middle East Broadcasting Networks (MBN) is a non-profit organization funded by the United States Congress through a grant from the U.S. Agency for Global Media (USAGM), an independent federal agency. The USAGM also funds Voice of America (VOA), Radio Free Europe/Radio Liberty, and Radio Free Asia. Until April 2025, the MBN operated the Arab-language television network Alhurra. It continues to run Alhurra.com and other social media platforms.

MBN's stated mission is to provide accurate and objective information and to "expand the spectrum of ideas, opinions, and perspectives" in the media in the MENA region, and to "accurately represent America, Americans, and American policies". Since 2025, State Media Monitor has classified MBN, together with other USAGM outlets, as state-controlled media, describing the agency as operating "under direct White House political direction".

Former U.S. diplomat Ambassador Alberto Fernandez was appointed as head of MBN in 2017. On November 4, 2018, MBN relaunched, pledging to introduce "innovative" programming. In 2019, after airing an investigative report alleging corruption within Iraq's Sunni and Shiite religious establishments, Iraqi authorities suspended the license of MBN's Alhurra television channel for three months.

Downsizing of MBN began in September 2024, following a mandate by the United States Congress to cut its budget by $20 million. In October 2024, Jeffrey Gedmin was appointed President and Chief Executive Officer of the Middle East Broadcasting Networks (MBN), following a period as acting head beginning in April 2024. In April 2025, an additional 500 employees of Alhurra were terminated after funding was frozen by the Trump Administration and the Department of Government Efficiency.

== History and funding ==
The purpose of launching MBN and its networks was to counter perceived anti-American bias promoted by the leading Arab and international television networks and the effect these channels were having on Arab public opinion regarding the U.S. MBN and its networks are intended to serve as an alternative to these channels by presenting the news in a more balanced and objective manner in an effort to improve the image of the United States in the Arab world.

Norman Pattiz, founder and chairman of mass-media company Westwood One, was the driving force behind the launch of Radio Sawa in 2002, a USAGM-administered Arabic-language radio network that broadcasts a mix of music and news. Pattiz served as a board member of the then BBG, currently the U.S. Agency for Global Media (USAGM), the U.S. independent federal agency that oversees all foreign non-military radio and TV broadcasts.

The idea to launch Alhurra in 2004 stemmed from the success of Radio Sawa in reaching young audiences in the Middle East. Pattiz believed that Arab audiences' views of the United States were being negatively influenced by existing Arab news networks’ focus on coverage of the wars in Iraq, Afghanistan, and the Israeli–Palestinian conflict. He envisioned that by presenting a wider range of perspectives on these conflicts and other U.S. policies, as well as coverage of a broader variety of regional and global issues of interest to Arab audiences, a U.S.-funded satellite TV channel could help improve America's image in the region. In pursuit of Pattiz's vision, the Bush administration requested appropriations for the channel from Congress and obtained $62 million in funding for the channel's first year of operation (including start-up costs). In the fall of 2003, construction began to renovate an existing TV station in Springfield, VA into a modern broadcast facility for the new channel. Construction was completed less than six months later, and Alhurra's first broadcast aired on February 14, 2004.

On March 15, 2025, the United States Agency for Global Media terminated grants to the Middle East Broadcasting Networks, Radio Free Europe/Radio Liberty and Radio Free Asia following a directive from the Trump Administration. As a result, MBN was forced to furlough over 90% of its staff and drastically reduce its programming. This abrupt funding cut, which was part of a broader executive order to dismantle USAGM, led MBN to file a lawsuit against the Trump administration, arguing the termination violated congressional appropriations and the U.S. Constitution. The courts responded with a preliminary injunction to block the shutdown and restore some protections for international broadcasters like MBN, but ongoing appeals kept the organization’s future uncertain and operations significantly curtailed.

The funding cuts received criticism from press freedom organizations, including the Committee to Protect Journalists, which argued that the move undermined the United States’ stated commitment to supporting free and independent media in the Middle East and North Africa region.

The organization and its staff defied the executive order and initially remained on the air while considering legal action to challenge the presidential directive. After ceasing television broadcasts, MBN’s remaining digital platforms — including its website (Alhurra.com) and official Facebook and YouTube channels — have provided real-time coverage of major events like the Israel–Iran conflict, drawing millions of online viewers even as the network’s future remained uncertain.

== Programming ==
Alhurra has increasingly emphasized digital-first, multimedia content tailored for online and mobile audiences in the Middle East and North Africa. The network produces original short-form video features, social-first series, and investigative content distributed across platforms such as YouTube and other digital outlets.

Featured segments include:

- Debatable with Ibrahim Eissa.
- The Diplomat, hosted by Joe Kawly, a podcast that offers listeners a behind-the-scenes look at U.S. foreign policy.
- Bitter Sweet, hosted by Rami El Amine.
- What’s the Story, hosted by Aya Elbaz.
- Close Up, hosted by Randa Jebai, is a multimedia investigative segment.
