= Bruce Harrison =

Bruce Harrison may refer to:

- Edgar Pangborn (1909–1976), American writer who was published under the pseudonym of Bruce Harrison
- E. Bruce Harrison (1932–2021), American public relations expert in anti-environmental legislation
