= Hassan Al-Basri Brigades =

Iraqi insurgent group

Hassan al-Basri Brigades
- كتائب حسن البصري
- Dates active: 2003–2007
- Dissolved: 2007
- Allegiance: Al-Qaeda in Iraq
- Ideology: Salafi jihadism

Hassan al-Basri Brigades (Arabic: كتائب حسن البصري, romanized: Katāʼib Ḥasan al-Baṣrī) was an Iraqi insurgent group during the Iraq insurgency.

== Attacks ==
Hassan al-Basri Brigades claimed many Jihadist attacks with Al-Qaeda on their website. This includes the bombing of an Iraqi police patrol in Basra, Iraq. The militant group also assassinated a man by the name of Abdel Hussein Khazaal, who was a correspondent for al-Hurra TV station, and murdered his 4-year-old son who has not been identified.
