= Radio Free Iraq =

- إذاعة العراق الحرّ
- Formation: 30 October 1998
- Defunct: July 31, 2015
- Purpose: Broadcast Media
- Headquarters: Prague Broadcast Center, Prague, Czech Republic
- Parent organization: U.S. Agency for Global Media
- Website: www.iraqhurr.org

Radio Free Iraq (Arabic: إذاعة العراق الحرّ, romanized: Izaa'at al 'Iraaq al Hurr) was a 24-hour radio station broadcasting in Arabic from Prague, Czech Republic, and directed to Iraq and the Iraqi diaspora. It started its broadcasts on 30 October 1998 and was part of the programming of Radio Free Europe/Radio Liberty (RFE/RL), which is funded by the United States Congress. The radio station also ran an online edition which had regularly updated news and reports in Arabic.

Iraqi president Saddam Hussein ordered the Iraqi Intelligence Service, to "violently disrupt the Iraqi broadcasting of Radio Free Europe". A plot to attack the Prague headquarters with an RPG-7 from a window across the street had been foiled by the Czech Security Information Service (BIS).

The service ended on July 31, 2015, after what RFE/RL characterized as a merger with Radio Sawa Iraq, part of the Arabic-language Sawa service that replaced the Voice of America Arabic service.
