= FreeMediaOnline.org =

Free Media Online is a California-based nonprofit organization dedicated to defending and advancing free speech and freedom of the press worldwide through journalistic, educational and information sharing activities. Free Media Online's main website, FreeMediaOnline.org, FreeMediaOnline.org has a blog Free Media Online Blog focused on media freedom, international broadcasting and public diplomacy. Free Media Online also publishes GovoritAmerika.us GovoritAmerika.US, a Russian-language news analysis website, and Opinia.US Opinia.US, a Polish-English bilingual news analysis website. Both websites offer current news, information and analysis from multiple sources, including US media and US government.

The organization's founder and president was Ted Lipien, He was in charge of VOA Polish radio programs during the Solidarity labor union's struggle for democracy in Poland in the 1980s and helped place VOA and Radio Free Europe/Radio Liberty (RFE/RL) programs on stations in the Balkans, Central and Eastern Europe, the former Soviet Union, Afghanistan, and in the Middle East. Other founders and associates also had careers in journalism, human rights organizations and academic institutions.

Free Media Online's stated goal is to help create a media environment supporting greater freedom, understanding and tolerance. The organization advocates for the rights of independent media and works to make free information available to journalists in media-at-risk countries. It also offers training programs in journalism and media marketing. Free Media Online is registered in California as a nonprofit public benefit corporation.

Free Media Online offers free information sharing and program delivery assistance to journalists and media organizations whose right of free expression is denied or restricted. Its reports and analysis of media freedom and independence issues around the world are available for use free of charge by any media organization or independent journalists.

Recent FreeMediaOnline.org reporting covered issues of censorship and other violations of freedom of the press in Russia, Iran, Cuba, and Venezuela. FreeMediaOnline.org has published articles critical of President Vladimir Putin's clampdown on independent media in Russia and Moscow's efforts to restrict rebroadcasting of RFE/RL and VOA news programs on Russian stations. FreeMediaOnline.org reports have been critical of the Bush Administration and the Broadcasting Board of Governors (BBG) for their plans to eliminate VOA radio programs in Russian and for insufficient support for media independence in Eurasia.

FreeMediaOnline.org also publishes articles analyzing issues of journalistic balance and objectivity in U.S. media reporting dealing with issues of press freedom.

== Sources ==
- Article from New York Times, November 24, 2006 by Doreen Carvajal discussing founding of FreeMediaOnLine
