= Michael Meehan =

Michael Meehan may refer to:

- Michael Meehan (Gaelic footballer), Irish Gaelic footballer
- Michael J. Meehan (1891–1948), American stock trader
- Michael P. Meehan, member of the Broadcasting Board of Governors

== See also ==
- Michaëla Ward-Meehan, Danish sailor
