= Alhurra =

US TV broadcasting to the Arab world

- Type: Satellite television network
- Country: United States (external consumption only)
- Headquarters: Newington, Virginia (Springfield mailing address)

Programming
- Languages: Literary Arabic (mainly), Arabic dialects, English (subtitled in Literary Arabic)

Ownership
- Owner: Middle East Broadcasting Networks (funded by the U.S. Agency for Global Media (USAGM), which oversees all U.S. government-funded foreign broadcasts)

History
- Launched: 14 February 2004

Links
- Webcast: alhurra.com/alhurra-live-stream
- Website: alhurra.com

Alhurra (Arabic: الحرة, lit. 'The Free One') is an American government-funded Arabic-language satellite television and digital media network that broadcasts news and current affairs programming to audiences in the Middle East and North Africa (MENA). It was launched on February 14, 2004, and is operated by the Middle East Broadcasting Networks (MBN), a non-profit grantee of the U.S. Agency for Global Media (USAGM), which also oversees Voice of America, Radio Free Europe/Radio Liberty, Radio Free Asia, and other international broadcasters.

The network initially focused on satellite television but has increasingly prioritized digital-first programming designed for younger and mobile audiences. Its content includes political analysis, investigative reports, and multimedia segments distributed through platforms such as YouTube, Instagram, Facebook, and X (formerly Twitter).

== History ==
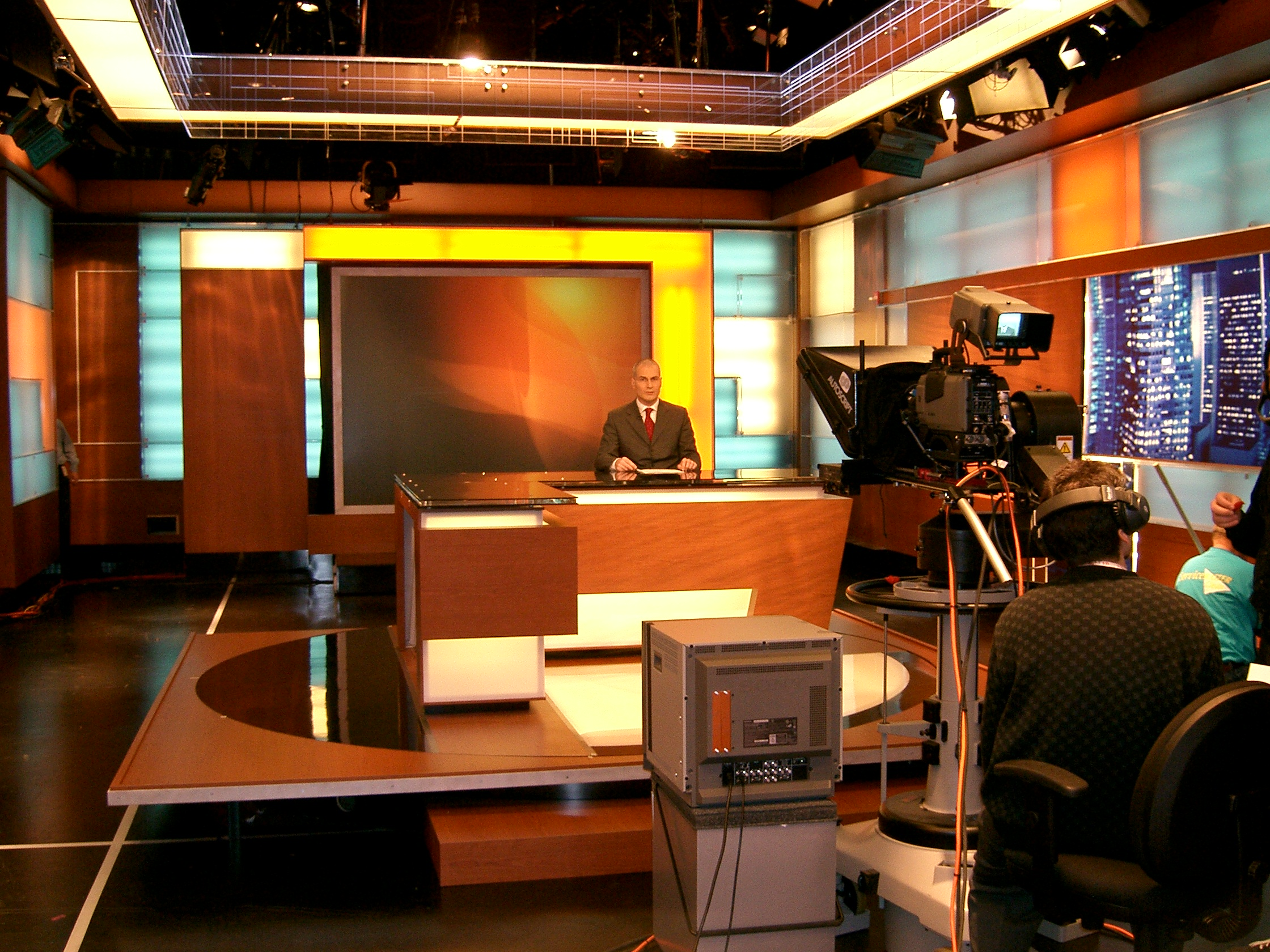
Alhurra's studio during the channel's first live broadcast, 14 February 2004

The decision to launch Alhurra was prompted by frustration among U.S. government officials over perceived anti-American bias among the leading Arab television networks and the effect these channels were having on Arab public opinion regarding the U.S. Alhurra was intended to serve as an alternative to these channels by presenting the news in a more "balanced and objective" manner in an effort to improve the image of the United States in the Arab world.

Alhurra logo between February 2004 – November 2009

The driving force behind the launch of Alhurra was Norman Pattiz, a media executive and founder and chairman of broadcast industry giant Westwood One. While serving as a member of the Broadcasting Board of Governors (BBG), currently the U.S. Agency for Global Media (USAGM), the U.S. federal agency that controls all foreign non-military radio and TV broadcasts, Pattiz advocated strongly for the creation of a U.S.-funded television network specifically directed at Arab audiences. Pattiz had also previously been responsible for the creation of Radio Sawa, a USAGM-administered Arabic-language radio network which broadcast a mix of music, entertainment, and news. The idea to launch Alhurra stemmed from the success that Radio Sawa had exhibited in reaching young audiences in the Middle East.

Pattiz believed that Arab audiences' views of the United States were being negatively influenced by existing Arab news networks' focus on coverage of the wars in Iraq, Afghanistan, and the Israeli–Palestinian conflict. He argued that by presenting a wider range of perspectives on these conflicts and other U.S. policies, as well as a coverage of a broader variety of regional and global issues of interest to Arab audiences, a U.S.-funded satellite TV channel could help improve America's image in the region.

In an appearance on CBS's 60 Minutes in May 2004, Pattiz described a powerful promotional video he helped produce which led to the successful launch of Alhurra:

"We showed the negative images that people get of the United States on Middle Eastern television," says Pattiz. "There was lots of anti-U.S. demonstrations—burning the president in effigy, stomping on the American flag. We then said, 'And this is what you see from America.' And we had about 4 seconds of black screen."

As a result of Pattiz's efforts, the Bush administration requested funding for the channel from Congress, and obtained $62 million in funding for its first year of operation (including start-up costs). In the fall of 2003, construction began to renovate an old TV channel building in Springfield, VA into a modern broadcast facility for the new channel. Construction was completed less than six months later, and Alhurra's first broadcast aired 14 February 2004.

In October 2024, Jeffrey Gedmin was appointed president and chief executive officer of the Middle East Broadcasting Networks (MBN), following a period as acting head beginning in April 2024. Bringing decades of leadership experience, Gedmin initiated a significant transformation at MBN, emphasizing digital innovation and a comprehensive review of content to strengthen the organization's future. His appointment was unanimously supported by the board to support MBN's journalists and expand its impact throughout the Middle East and North Africa. In March 2025, Elon Musk's Department of Government Efficiency (DOGE) imposed a 30-day total freeze on funding to MBN and other USAGM outlets, with the intention of making that permanent.

== Organization and funding ==
Middle East Broadcasting Networks (MBN) is a non-profit organization financed through a grant from the U.S. Agency for Global Media (USAGM), formerly the Broadcasting Board of Governors (BBG), an independent federal agency funded by the U.S. Congress. The U.S. Agency for Global Media oversees all U.S. public broadcasting outlets and is intended to act as a firewall to protect the editorial independence and professional integrity of the broadcasters.

Alhurra's headquarters are in Springfield, Virginia. The network also maintains bureaus in Baghdad and Dubai, production centers in Beirut, Jerusalem, Cairo, Rabat, Erbil and Washington, D.C., as well as correspondents throughout the Middle East, North Africa, the United States and Europe.

On March 15, 2025, the United States Agency for Global Media terminated grants to the Middle East Broadcasting Networks, Radio Free Europe/Radio Liberty and Radio Free Asia following a directive from the Trump Administration. As a result, MBN was forced to furlough over 90% of its staff and drastically reduce its programming. This abrupt funding cut, which was part of a broader executive order to dismantle USAGM, led MBN to file a lawsuit against the Trump administration, arguing the termination violated congressional appropriations and the U.S. Constitution. The courts responded with a preliminary injunction to block the shutdown and restore some protections for international broadcasters like MBN, but ongoing appeals kept the organization's future uncertain and operations significantly curtailed.

The funding cuts received criticism from press freedom organizations, including the committee to Protect Journalists, which argued that the move undermined the United States’ stated commitment to supporting free and independent media in the Middle East and North Africa region.

The organization and its staff defied the executive order and initially remained on the air while considering legal action to challenge the presidential directive. After ceasing television broadcasts, MBN's remaining digital platforms — including its website (Alhurra.com) and official Facebook and YouTube channels — have provided real-time coverage of major events like the Israel–Iran conflict, drawing millions of online viewers even as the network's future remained uncertain.

== Awards ==
In 2019, Alhurra's report Power of Forgiveness won the People's Voice Award in the category of Best Documentary.

In 2016, Alhurra Television's documentary series "Delusional Paradise" won the Silver Award at the Cannes Corporate Media & TV Awards. And the promotional video for the "Delusional Paradise" won a bronze medal at the New York Festivals International Television & Film Awards.

In 2014, three Alhurra shows won the Special Jury Award at the CINE Golden Eagle Awards. Street Pulse (Arabic: نبض الشارع), Where are We Going (رايحين على فين) and a promotional clip for the project Syrian Stories, have won prizes in 2014.

Street Pulse won the prize of the best documentary in the Middle East for the year 2013, especially for the episode the Tragedy of Quarry Workers in Minya (مأساة عمال المحاجر في المنيا).

In 2023, Alhurra.com won the Web Excellence Award for Best Website: Media/News. The Arabic-language platform, managed by the Middle East Broadcasting Networks (MBN), was recognized for its news coverage, analysis, and fact-based digital content. The 9th Web Excellence Awards competition received over 1,350 entries from 29 countries and 38 U.S. states, with the Award of Excellence given only to entrants judged to represent the best on the web.

In May, 2024, Alhurra received two Telly Awards for its digital reporting. Alhurra.com's report, "Labaki’s Victims Speak Out," which focused on abuse allegations against Lebanese priest Mansour Labaki, won silver in the category of Online–Social Issues. Another Alhurra.com production, "Digital Twins," examined the evolution of artificial intelligence and the dangers of deepfakes, earning bronze in Online–Public Interest and Awareness.

== Notable Programs ==
Alhurra has increasingly emphasized digital-first, multimedia content tailored for online and mobile audiences in the Middle East and North Africa. The network produces original short-form video features, social-first series, and investigative content distributed across platforms such as YouTube and other digital outlets.

Notable segments include:

Debatable with Ibrahim Eissa, hosted by veteran journalist Ibrahim Eissa, is a multimedia segment available in both short- and long-form video formats, often accompanied by written articles. The segment features intellectually grounded discussions on topics such as faith, family, identity, and ideology. Known for his candid style, Eissa challenges guests with questions rooted in historical context and cultural nuance, encouraging open dialogue around sensitive and often controversial issues.

The Diplomat, hosted by Joe Kawly, is a podcast that offers listeners a behind-the-scenes look at U.S. foreign policy. It features in-depth conversations with diplomats, policymakers, and experts as they discuss major global challenges, critical decisions, and the complex dynamics of war and peace. Through candid, accessible dialogue, the podcast aims to demystify diplomacy and explore the ideas and strategies that shape international relations.

Bitter Sweet, hosted by Rami El Amine, is a multimedia segment that uses satire and sharp wit to comment on political and social issues in the Middle East. Blending humor with critical insight, the program aims to engage a digital-savvy audience and highlight complex realities often overlooked in mainstream discourse. Through its satirical approach, Bitter Sweet seeks to revive political awareness among a younger, digitally connected generation.

What's the Story, hosted by Aya Elbaz, is a multimedia segment that offers a fresh, Gen Z perspective on social and cultural topics across the Middle East and North Africa. Known for her direct tone and engaging style, Elbaz brings a relatable and inquisitive voice to the screen, aiming to connect with younger audiences through short-form, digital-first content. The segment blends storytelling with contemporary issues to spark curiosity and conversation among a new generation of viewers.

Close Up, hosted by Randa Jebai, is a multimedia investigative segment that presents in-depth stories through both short- and long-form video formats, accompanied by written articles. The program is known for its compelling storytelling and detailed reporting, focusing on underreported issues and human-interest narratives from across the Middle East and North Africa. Jebai's approach combines journalistic rigor with a narrative style that brings complex topics to life for a broad digital audience.

== Viewership ==
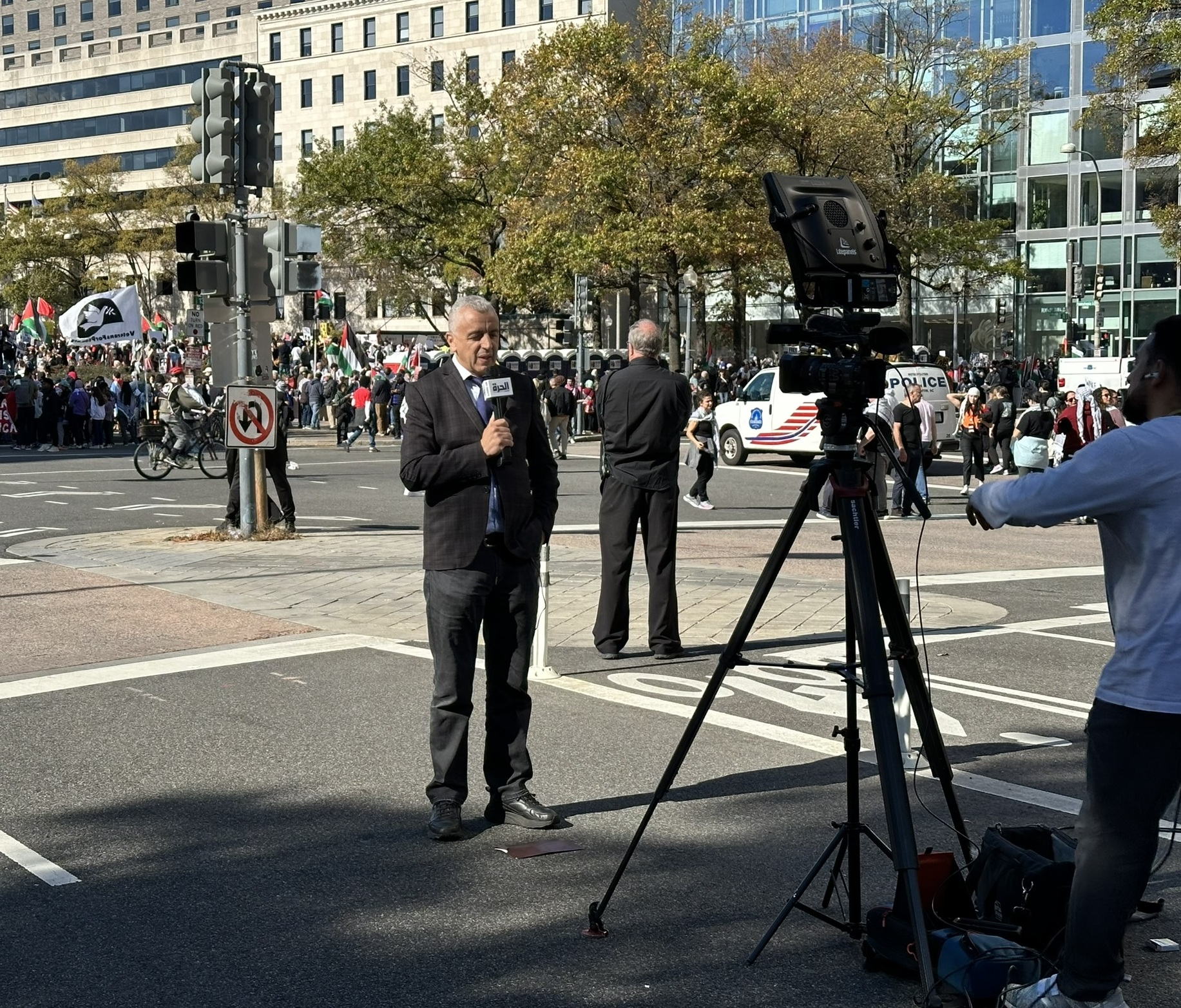
An Alhurra reporter at the March on Washington: Free Palestine in 2023

Alhurra competes with more than 550 Arabic-language satellite TV channels for its audience in the Middle East, and as a result Alhurra initially struggled after its launch in 2004 to attract viewers in the already-crowded Arab media market. Annual surveys commissioned by the USAGM showed that Alhurra's weekly audience grew by 28% between 2004 and 2008, surpassing 25 million. Recent surveys by international research organizations including ACNielsen show that Alhurra has consistently averaged approximately 26 million weekly viewers in its broadcast region from 2009 to 2011. While this number is dwarfed by the overall viewership of Qatar-funded channel Al Jazeera and Saudi Arabia-funded Al Arabiya, it is nevertheless greater than the viewership of all other non-indigenous Arabic-language news networks (including CNN Arabic, BBC Arabic and France24's Arabic-language channel) combined. A USAGM-commissioned poll in February 2011 found that 25% of Egyptians living in Cairo and Alexandria tuned into Alhurra during the protests in that country in January 2011, surpassing Al Jazeera's 22% viewership during the same period.

Although not a traditional viewership survey, University of Maryland/Zogby polls of several Arab nations (Jordan, Lebanon, Morocco, Saudi Arabia, and the UAE) asked which channels viewers tuned into most often. Just 2% overall stated that Alhurra was the channel they turned to most often in 2008, and that number dropped to 1% in 2009 (this poll added Egyptian respondents).

However, the channel's popularity has shown some signs of improvement in recent years, particularly in Iraq, which has proven to be Alhurra's most successful market in the Arab world. A 2005 Ipsos poll found that just 14% of Iraqi respondents tuned into Alhurra (ranking 11th place). However, a 2008 Ipsos poll of Iraqi viewers found the network's popularity had increased to 18%, overtaking Al Jazeera (15%). This improvement could be due to Alhurra's launch of Alhurra-Iraq, an Iraq-focused channel with programming tailored especially to the Iraqi audience. In its FY2010 budget submission, the U.S. Agency for Global Media (USAGM), formerly the Broadcasting Board of Governors (BBG), noted that the channel's viewership had improved to 5th place in the Iraqi market.

== Threats to journalists ==
Alhurra journalists and correspondents have frequently faced threats, intimidation, and violence from both government and non-state actors opposed to their coverage.

Some notable incidents include:

- In August 2012, Syrian authorities reportedly injured and detained Alhurra reporter, Bashar Fahmy.
- In June 2011, Yemeni authorities attacked an Alhurra reporter and photographer who were covering a sit-in taking place in front of the Vice President's house in Sanaa.
- In March 2011, Alhurra reporter Abdel Karim Al-Shaibani was assaulted and beaten by unknown assailants on a street in Sanaa.
- In February 2011, Alhurra's Cairo bureau was targeted during the unrest in Egypt. Unknown armed men stormed its offices and "threatened to kill Al-Hurra's two on-air journalists—Akram Khuzam and Tarek El Shamy—if they didn't leave the building."
- Beginning 2 February 2011, Alhurra's satellite signal was jammed for nearly a month by Libyan authorities in response to coverage of anti-government protests in the country.
- In October 2010, Tahrir Kadhim Jawad, a freelance journalist and contributor to Alhurra, was killed when a bomb attached to his car exploded in Garma, Iraq, west of Baghdad in Al Anbar Governorate.
- In May 2010, Mauritanian police beat several journalists and briefly detained Hachem Sidi Salem, a local correspondent for the satellite television channel Alhurra, for covering a strike by members of the National Bar Association.
- In October 2008, Alhurra TV correspondent Saad Qusay was forced to request around-the-clock police protection at his home in Basra after being threatened by a militant group. The authorities subsequently advised Qusay to leave the country temporarily as an additional safety measure.
- In April 2008, Iraqi cameraman Mazin al-Tayar was shot in the leg as he filmed a military operation in Hayaniyah for Alhurra.
- In December 2006, Unidentified gunmen shot and wounded Omar Mohammad, an Alhurra correspondent, in Baghdad's central Bab al-Sharqi area.
- In February 2005, Iraqi Alhurra correspondent Abdul-Hussein Khazal and his three-year-old son were shot dead by unknown gunmen in Basra.

== Historical controversies ==
=== Allegations of pro-American bias ===
The fact that Alhurra is funded by the U.S. Congress through the U.S. Agency for Global Media (USAGM), formerly the Broadcasting Board of Governors (BBG), has led some critics to claim that the channel is "state propaganda" and presents its news with a pro-American bias. Alhurra has openly tried to distinguish itself from the perceived anti-American tone of its competition. Executives in the channel's early days instructed broadcasters to avoid the use of "loaded" terms (such as "martyr," "resistance fighters," or "occupation forces") used frequently on networks such as al-Jazeera in reporting about the U.S. military operation in Iraq, opting for terms like "armed groups" and "U.S. and coalition forces."

Alhurra is observed by Arab journalists as complying too scrupulously with embargoes on military information when Western media outlets frequently disregard these same requests. Steve Tatham, a British Royal Navy officer, recorded an instance in which a British officer briefed Arab and Western media that a humanitarian aid ship was being held back pending operations against Iraqi insurgents in the area. According to Tatham's account, when the officer asked the media to delay reporting this information for security reasons, Fox News disregarded the request whereas Alhurra complied.

Mouafac Harb, Alhurra's first news director who resigned from the organization in 2006, claimed that he left in part because he "sensed the U.S. Agency for Global Media (USAGM), formally the Broadcasting Board of Governors wanted Alhurra to promote U.S. foreign policy instead of just reporting the news." Harb claimed that at Alhurra there had been a "tendency to please Washington and not the [Arab] audience."

=== Allegations of anti-American bias ===
Alhurra has also faced criticism from American conservative pundits who claimed that the organization had been broadcasting "anti-American" content. In 2007, conservative columnist Joel Mowbray wrote a series of harshly critical op-eds in The Wall Street Journal, claiming that Alhurra had become a "platform for terrorists." Mowbray noted that Alhurra had broadcast live, unedited speeches by Hezbollah leader Hassan Nasrallah and Hamas leader Ismail Haniyeh, an interview with an alleged al-Qaeda operative who expressed joy at the 9/11 attacks, and a panel whose members offered conspiracy theories about alleged Israeli plans to destroy the al-Aqsa Mosque in Jerusalem.

Mowbray also cited unnamed Alhurra staffers who accused news director Larry Register of "trying to pander to Arab sympathies" to make the channel more like Al Jazeera. Register – a veteran CNN producer who had been appointed as Mouafac Harb's successor with a charge to overhaul the channel's operations and increase viewership – was forced to resign as a result of the public uproar created by Mowbray's articles.

A 2008 U.S. Inspector General's office report noted that Alhurra has taken significant steps to tighten its procedures and policies in order to protect the credibility that is critical to fulfilling its mission.

=== Criticism of administration and oversight ===
A critical 60 Minutes and ProPublica report in 2008 stated that "there appeared to be little oversight of the daily operations" of Alhurra. The report criticized Alhurra's top executives and directors for either lacking Arabic-language proficiency or possessing a media background to ensure that the broadcasts met basic journalistic standards.

A 2010 report from the U.S. Inspector General's office noted that inspectors "heard consistent reports of poor communication in the news operation." The inspector's main criticism was of the channel's news director Daniel Nassif, who was highlighted in reports of "newsroom management issues that were reported to the inspectors to have arisen during his tenure or remain unsettled from an earlier time." The hiring of several employee's relatives also led to accusations of nepotism. However, the same report also determined that MBN exercised tighter editorial controls over its programming and maintained the editorial principles for balance and comprehensiveness found in the International Broadcasting Act of 1994.

== See also ==
- Radio Free Asia
- Radio Sawa
- Radio Free Europe/Radio Liberty
- Voice of America
- U.S. Agency for Global Media
- Al-hurra (title)
