= Norm Pattiz =

American broadcasting entrepreneur (1943–2022)

- Born: Norman Joel Pattiz; January 18, 1943; Los Angeles, California, U.S.
- Died: December 4, 2022 (aged 79)
- Education: Santa Monica College
- Occupation: Businessman
- Known for: Founder of Westwood One
- Spouse: Mary Turner

Norman Joel Pattiz (January 18, 1943 – December 4, 2022) was an American broadcasting entrepreneur who founded radio network Westwood One. Pattiz was a member of the National Radio Hall of Fame.

== Career ==
Pattiz worked in the sales dept at KCOP TV 13 in Hollywood from 1970 to 1974. He founded Westwood One, a radio syndication company, in 1976. It became America's largest radio network and one of the world's leading media companies.

In 2001, Pattiz joined the Board of Regents of the University of California and served as chair of the board of the Regents Oversight Committee of the Department of Energy Laboratories. In January 2014, Governor of California Jerry Brown reappointed Pattiz to a second twelve year term on the board of regents. In November 2016, he was accused of workplace sexual harassment. The University of California Student Association called for dismissal of Pattiz from the board of regents in 2017 following an allegation by a podcast host. Pattiz apologized and claimed it was a joke. In December 2017, Pattiz resigned from the board of regents.

Pattiz was also chairman of the board of Lawrence Livermore and Los Alamos National Security LLC and on the board of the USC Annenberg School for Communication and Journalism. He was president of the Broadcast Education Association and was on the Council of Foreign Relations and the Pacific Council on International Policy. He was appointed by President Clinton for the United States Broadcasting Board of Governors (BBG), which oversees all U.S. non-military international broadcast services, in 2000, and reappointed by President Bush in 2002. He was chairman of BBG's Middle East Committee, where he helped create the U.S. government's Arabic-language radio and TV services broadcast to the 22 Middle East countries, including Radio Sawa and Alhurra Television.

In 2009, Pattiz was inducted into the National Radio Hall of Fame. Pattiz also received the Giants of Broadcasting Award from the Library of American Broadcasting.

Pattiz founded Courtside Entertainment Group in 2010 and was the company’s CEO. In October 2012, Pattiz founded Launchpad, which became PodcastOne in February 2013. Pattiz worked with the Los Angeles Lakers and Jay Mohr to develop the "America's Lakers Podcast With Jay Mohr" in 2017. Pattiz was inspired by his support of the Lakers, including his 35 years with courtside seats.

== Personal life and death ==
Pattiz is Jewish and was married to Mary Turner, former radio personality and chairman of the board of the Betty Ford Center. They resided in both Beverly Hills, California, and Santa Barbara, California. He was a reserve deputy in the Los Angeles County Sheriff's Department and a member of the Region 1 Homeland Security Advisory Council. He was the benefactor of the Academy of Music at Hamilton High School and on the board of the Sheriff's Youth Foundation. The Norman J. Pattiz Concert Hall on the Hamilton campus is named in his honor.

Pattiz died on December 4, 2022, at the age of 79.
