= E. Bruce Harrison =

Public relations professional (1932–2021)

- Born: April 3, 1932; Alabama, United States
- Died: January 16, 2021 (aged 88)
- Occupation: Public relations
- Known for: Greenwashing, climate change denial
- Spouse: Patricia Harrison

E. Bruce Harrison (April 3, 1932 – January 16, 2021) was a public relations expert who organized several campaigns for U.S. industry against environmental legislation from the 1970s to the 1990s. Harrison's company is credited with industry opposition to the Kyoto Protocol and preventing the United States from ratifying it.

== Career ==
The publication of Rachel Carson's Silent Spring in 1962 created the first wave of environmental action, and caused concern amongst industrial corporations across the United States. Harrison, who was then working for the Manufacturing Chemists' Association, led a campaign to defame Carson and prevent new regulations to restrict pesticides and industrial pollution, a campaign that Harrison and the association ultimately lost.

He ran his eponymous PR firm, which he co-founded with his wife Patricia Harrison, from 1973 until 1997, when he sold it. Harrison pioneered the use of economic analysis in opposing environmental action. He developed a messaging strategy which promoted the balance of "the three Es": Environment, Energy, and Economy. Following the creation of new environmental legislation and the creation of the Environmental Protection Agency, Harrison was employed by the American Petroleum Institute as a lobbyist and PR representative. In this role he created the National Environmental Development Association (NEDA), a lobby group that represented a coalition of chemical, mining, oil and gas companies which sought to limit further regulation and sow misinformation about the environmental and climate impacts of fossil fuels.

NEDA was the first client of his PR firm. In the early 1990s, he conducted a comprehensive PR campaign for the Global Climate Coalition, an industrial lobby opposing action to reduce greenhouse gas emissions. In 1995 he wrote that the "GCC has successfully turned the tide on press coverage of global climate change science".

== Legacy ==
In 1999, PRWeek included Harrison into its hall of fame, and followed this in 2000 by naming him as one of the '100 Most Influential Public Relations Professionals of the 20th Century'.

Harrison and his agency are acknowledged as the creators of modern greenwashing, producing misinformation and disinformation campaigns for companies including General Motors, Monsanto and BP. His work has had a lasting impact on promoting misinformation about climate change, particularly in misleading the public about the economic costs of mitigating the impacts of climate change.

Media historian Melissa Aronczyk considered Harrison "a master at what he did". Al Gore, former U.S. vice president, described the GCC campaign as the worst moral crime since the world wars.
