= Devon Powers =

American communication studies professor, author

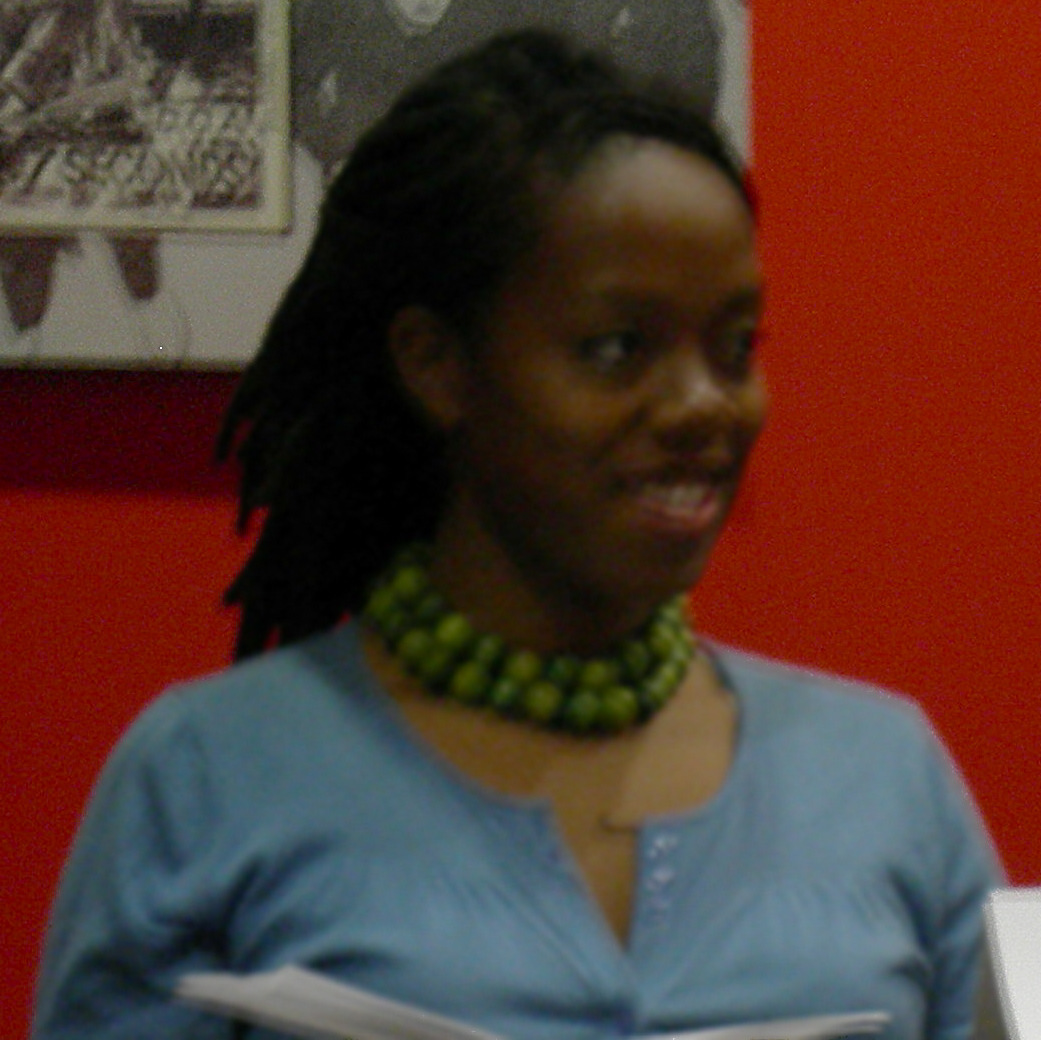
- Powers at the 2007 Pop Conference, Experience Music Project, Seattle, Washington
- Born: 1977 or 1978 (age 48–49)
- Occupations: Music journalist, professor
- Spouse: David Bennion (m. 2007)

Academic background
- Education: New York University (2008)

Academic work
- Institutions: Drexel University (2008–2016); Temple University (2016–2022); University of Michigan (2022–)
- Notable works: Blowing Up the Brand; Writing the Record; On Trend

Devon Powers (born 1977 or 1978) is an American communication studies professor, author, and former music journalist.

== Biography ==
Powers was born in 1977 or 1978. Her father, Lee R. Powers, is an engineer and her mother, Mandy Powers, is a nurse. In 2007 she married lawyer David Bennion. Powers is African American.

In 1999, she earned a Bachelor of Arts degree in English and women's studies from Oberlin College and, in 2008, a Ph.D. in media studies from New York University.

Between 2001 and 2004, she worked as a freelance music journalist, largely writing for PopMatters.

As of 2023, she is a professor of communication and media at the University of Michigan. Her research interests include consumer culture (historical and contemporary) and shifts in cultural intermediation, circulation and promotion.

She has written two books, Writing the Record: The Village Voice and the Birth of Rock Criticism (2013) and On Trend: The Business of Forecasting the Future (2019) and, with Melissa Aronczyk, co-edited Blowing Up the Brand: Critical Perspectives on Promotional Culture (2010).

== Writing the Record ==
In 2013, University of Massachusetts Press published Writing the Record: The Village Voice and the Birth of Rock Criticism. In the monograph, a reworking of her doctoral thesis, Powers provides a deeply researched analysis of the challenging relationship between critics and the rise of pop culture in the 1950s through the 1970s. To tell this story, she focuses on the careers of Richard Goldstein and Robert Christgau, both writers at New York's famed Village Voice. Powers argues that these music journalists should be considered public intellectuals, even though they weren't traditional academics.

Powers was influenced to study the topic because of her own work as a music journalist. She says she tested many of her ideas about the social function of music criticism in a regular column she wrote for PopMatters titled More Than Words: Musings on Music Journalism.

== On Trend ==
In 2019, University of Illinois Press published On Trend: The Business of Forecasting the Future, a study of the cultural economy of the trend analysis and futurology industry. Powers employed ethnographic research methods, visiting forecasting companies such as Sparks & Honey and conducting dozens of interviews to collect material for the book. Scott McLemee notes that the book shines a light on the largely opaque but influential trend-spotting industry.

On Trend was selected as a 2020 Choice Outstanding Academic Title.
