= Michael P. Meehan =

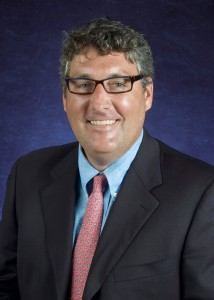

Member of the Broadcasting Board of Governors
- President: Barack Obama

Personal details
- Political party: Democratic Party

Michael P. Meehan was appointed to the Broadcasting Board of Governors by Barack Obama. Meehan is co-chair of the Communications and Outreach Committee of the BBG, chair of its Strategy and Budget Committee and the Global Internet Freedom Committee.

== Career ==
For the past six years, Meehan has built a communications strategy and public relations firm, VennSquared.

Before going into business, Meehan worked for 23 years on Capitol Hill and in political campaigns. Meehan served in senior roles for U.S. Senators John Kerry, Barbara Boxer, Maria Cantwell and former Senate Majority Leader Tom Daschle, and Congressmen Vic Fazio and John Olver.
