= CNN Arabic =

Arabic-language version of CNN

- Available in: Arabic
- Headquarters: Dubai Media City, United Arab Emirates
- Owners: CNN (Skydance)
- Website: arabic.cnn.com
- Registration: None

Cable News Network Arabic (known as CNN Arabic, Arabic: سي إن إن بالعربية) is a news website located in Dubai launched on 19 January 2002. Part of the CNN network, it provides international news in the Arabic language, with continuous updates on regional and international developments.

The CNN Arabic website is managed by several professional and experienced Arab journalists. The website consists of a number of sections, including world news, Middle East, science and technology, business, entertainment, and sports, in addition to special reports and videos.

The website provides a number of additional services such as a free email feed of breaking news, and breaking news via SMS. The website includes information about CNN network and advertising on television and the different websites.

== Controversies ==
During the 2019 constitutional referendum in Egypt which would extend the presidential terms limit, CNN Arabic started a poll allowing people to vote whether they endorse or oppose the referendum. According to Amr Waked, an Egyptian actor and a political dissident, the votes in the CNN Arabic poll was going normal until 14:42 to 14:57 the poll results rapidly changed. He accused the CNN Arabic of manipulating the poll results in favour of the Egyptian president Abdel Fattah el-Sisi.

== See also ==
- Gulf News
- Nabd
