= Melissa Aronczyk =

Canadian academic

- Born: Canada
- Education: PhD, New York University (Media, Culture and Communication)
- Occupations: Media studies scholar, professor
- Employer: Rutgers University
- Known for: Research on branding, political communication, promotional culture, nationalism
- Notable work: Branding the Nation: The Global Business of National Identity (2013); Blowing Up the Brand: Critical Perspectives on Promotional Culture (2010); A Strategic Nature: Public Relations and the Politics of Environmentalism (2022)
- Awards: Outstanding Young Scholar Award, International Communication Association (2015)

Melissa Aronczyk is a Canadian media studies scholar working in the United States. She is a member of the faculty of Rutgers University in the School of Communication and Information and affiliated faculty in Sociology and with the Eagleton Institute of Politics. Her expertise includes media and political promotion, corporate political advocacy, nationalism, and the political purposes of branding. Dr. Aronczyk has published three books, Branding the Nation: The Global Business of National Identity from Oxford University Press in 2013,; Blowing Up the Brand: Critical Perspectives on Promotional Culture from Peter Lang, in 2010 (co-edited with Devon Powers). and A Strategic Nature: Public Relations and the Politics of Environmentalism (Oxford University Press, co-authored with Maria Espinoza) in Spring 2022.

Dr. Aronczyk's work has been featured on the BBC, in The Washington Post, The Intercept, Grist Magazine, and the podcast Drilled, among other media outlets.

In 2015, she was co-recipient of the International Communication Association's Outstanding Young Scholar Award. Prior to joining Rutgers, she was a professor of communication at Carleton University in Ottawa. She holds a Ph.D. from the Department of Media, Culture and Communication at New York University.
