= Grammy Global Impact Award =

Music award

- Awarded for: "Black music creators whose dedication to the art form has greatly influenced the industry"
- Country: United States
- Presented by: The Recording Academy
- First award: 2022; 4 years ago
- Website: grammy.com

The Grammy Global Impact Award is a special Grammy Award that is awarded by The Recording Academy to "Black music creators whose dedication to the art form has greatly influenced the industry". The award was established by the Recording Academy's Black Music Collective, which was created with the goal of "amplifying Black voices within the Academy and the wider music community". The award is in the category of Special Merit awards.

The honor was established and awarded to its inaugural recipient in 2022. The subsequent year, with Dr. Dre as one of the recipients, the award was inaugurated yet again, as the Dr. Dre Global Impact Award.

== Global Impact Award Recipients ==
Year	Recipient	Ref.
2022	John Legend	
2023	Dr Dre, Lil Wayne, Missy Elliott, Sylvia Rhone	
2024	Lenny Kravitz, Mariah Carey, Jay-Z	
2025	Alicia Keys	
2026	Pharrell Williams	
