= Radio Sawa =

US radio broadcasting to the Arab world

- Frequency: Variously on FM (Transmission section)

Programming
- Languages: Newscasts and informational content in Literary Arabic with a small content in spoken dialects.

Ownership
- Owner: Middle East Broadcasting Networks
- Sister stations: Alhurra

History
- First air date: March 23, 2002
- Last air date: November 2024

Links
- Website: www.radiosawa.com

Radio Sawa (Arabic: راديو سوا [ˈrɑ(ː)djo ˈsæwæ]) was an Arabic speaking radio station broadcasting to the Arab world from March 23, 2002, until November 2024. The station was a service of the Middle East Broadcasting Networks, Inc., which also operates Alhurra Television and was publicly funded by the U.S. Agency for Global Media and the U.S. Congress. The word "sawa" (سوا, IPA: [ˈsæwæ, ˈsawa]) means "together" in many Arabic dialects.

Preexisting attitudes and concurrent reality of opinions towards the United States led to the creation of Radio Sawa. It sought to effectively communicate with the youthful population of Arabic-speakers in the Middle East. The station's goal is to promote pro-American attitudes to youth in the Arab world. Radio Sawa's first broadcast was on March 23, 2002. Its newscasts were broadcast live on air from its studios in Washington, D.C. and Dubai, United Arab Emirates. Radio Sawa also had news bureaus and reporters throughout the Middle East.

== History ==
Radio Sawa and its sister-network, Al Hurra TV, are part of a larger U.S. Public Diplomacy effort in the Middle East. Their stated mission is to "improve America's image in the Middle East and win the hearts and minds of the Arab people."

Radio Sawa was first launched on 23 March 2002, initially in Jordan, West Bank, Kuwait, UAE (Abu Dhabi), Qatar and Bahrain and eventually in the rest of the Arab World (see below for full list).

Radio Sawa replaced Voice of America's Arabic service, which had not been successful in attracting large audiences. The initiator of Radio Sawa is American media mogul Norm Pattiz. He found that more than 60% of the Arab population was under the age of 30, which is why he decided to develop programming that would target the younger generation. Pattiz believed that the best way to reach the young people was with music. This is why the majority of the radio's programming consists of American and Arab pop music.

Radio Sawa is controlled by the Broadcasting Board of Governors (BBG), the Federal agency responsible for all U.S. international civilian broadcasting. The BBG founded the Middle East Broadcasting Networks (MBN), a non-profit news and information organization, to run Radio Sawa and Al Hurra TV.

=== Funding ===
Radio Sawa is a United States Congress-funded public relations endeavor.

== Historical programming before the 2019 revamp ==
In contrast to the Voice of America radio broadcasts in the region which it replaced, Radio Sawa blended news with contemporary music, arts and lifestyle and other light programming. Radio Sawa's programming consisted of roughly 20–25% news and 75–80% pop songs.

=== News ===
Apart from songs, most other content is presented in the rubric "The World Now" (العالم الآن), which included news, interviews, sports, etc.

=== Songs ===
The station's playlist included popular Arabic (Middle Eastern), English (mostly American hits) and Spanish (mostly Latin American) songs so as to attract the Arabic listener.

=== Special programming ===
There were also occasional specials.

== Reaction ==
Radio Sawa has been subject to criticism from various observers, who question its effectiveness in conveying America's message to the Arab world. Radio Sawa is commonly seen as terms of a solution to public relations crisis during the time of its launch as a form of public diplomacy, 'suggesting by implication that American media efforts do have the power to transform opinion if only implemented in a different form'.

=== Arab World ===
A study published in 2006, which surveyed college students at universities in five Arab countries, found that the students' attitudes towards U.S. foreign policy had actually worsened since they started listening to Radio Sawa and watching Al Hurra TV

Radio Sawa has also been criticized for its poor quality control and for its resistance to any outside review of its programming.

=== United States ===
A 2004 draft report prepared by the State Department's inspector general was severely critical of the station. Experts cited in the report concluded that "Radio Sawa failed to present America to its audience."

The station's emphasis on popular music has led critics to question if music alone is enough to convey America's message. Some critics point out that what matters is "not just how many people are tuning in, but how many people are affected by a broadcast's content."

== Transmission ==
Radio Sawa is broadcast using Medium wave (AM) transmitters, FM transmitters, audio satellite broadcasting, and internet streaming.

Radio Sawa also broadcasts regional programmes:

- Radio Sawa
- Radio Sawa Iraq
- Radio Sawa Sudan

=== FM transmissions ===
Names of the cities next to them the broadcast frequency of FM in MHz.

- Amman, Jordan – 98.1
- Ajloun, Jordan - 107.4
- Ramallah, West Bank - 94.2
- Nablus, West Bank - 94.5
- Hebron, West Bank - 100.2
- Jenin, West Bank - 93.5
- West Bank, other cities - 98.1
- Gaza Strip - 100.2
- Iraq, all areas - 100.5
- Khartoum, Sudan - 97.5

=== Former AM transmissions ===
- The Cape Greco, Cyprus transmitter on Medium Wave to Egypt and the Levant – 990 kHz, formerly 891 kHz
  also 1260 kHz from Rhodes in the years 2002—2006
- Iraq – 1593 kHz
- Kuwait – 1548 kHz (as of mid-2023 broadcast Radio Farda in Persian)
- Sudan and Yemen – 1431 kHz (as of mid-2023 currently broadcast Voice of America in English, French, and Somali)

== Shut down ==
Over its last 5 years, Radio Sawa kept scaling down, from broadcasting on the medium wave, FM, and online streaming to just FM, streaming, and podcasting, to only streaming mostly the audio of Alhurra TV and podcasting, until November 2024, when the live stream ceased and later the website radiosawa.com started redirecting to alhurra.com.

== See also ==
- Radio Farda, targeting Iran
- Alhurra, Radio Sawa's sister TV
- Press TV, an Iranian governmental TV
- IRIB World Service, an Iranian governmental radio
- Al Jazeera, a Qatari governmental TV
- CCTV International Arabic, Chinese governmental TV
- Rusiya Al-Yaum (RT in Arabic), Russian governmental TV
- Al Mayadeen, a Hezbollah affiliated Lebanese TV
- France 24, a French news TV
- Monte Carlo Doualiya, a French radio
