= Cheryl Halpern =

Cheryl Feldman Halpern is an American public relations executive and government official who was the chair of the Corporation for Public Broadcasting (CPB) from 2005 to 2007. She has extensive experience with overseeing pro-American media campaigns abroad. In 1990, she was confirmed as a member of the Board for International Broadcasting and as a director of Radio Free Europe/Radio Liberty (RFE/RL). From 1995 through 2002, she served as a member of the Broadcasting Board of Governors, which oversees non-military overseas broadcasts by the US Government such as Radio Martí, the Voice of America, and Radio Free Iraq. In 2004 Halpern and her husband were among the top 100 political "hard money" donors in the US, primarily to Republican candidates.

Halpern has been nominated to the boards of national or international public broadcasting organizations by Presidents George H. W. Bush, Bill Clinton and George W. Bush. She is also a board member of the Washington Institute for Near East Policy, a Washington D.C.-based foreign policy interest group, and of the International Republican Institute.

Additionally, President George W. Bush appointed Halpern to serve on the Honorary Delegation to accompany him to Jerusalem for the celebration of the 60th anniversary of the State of Israel in May 2008.

In December 2008, Halpern was nominated to be an alternate U.N. representative for the United States (Alternate representatives present U.S. views in a number of smaller forums, including at committee meetings and at ancillary U.N. bodies). She held this position until September 2009 when the U.N. General Assembly's 63rd session ended.

Halpern is a graduate of Barnard College and received her A.B. in 1975. She also received her MBA from New York University Stern School of Business in 1980.

== Awards and nominations ==
Year	Awards	Category	Work	Outcome
2015	The Short Film Awards SOFIE Award	Best Short Film from the Vault	Natsanat	Won
