= United States Agency for Global Media =

Agency of the United States government

Coordinates: 38°53′14″N 77°01′02″W

Agency overview
- Formed: October 1, 1999; 27 years ago
- Preceding agencies: United States Information Agency; Office of Affiliate Relations and Media Training
- Type: Independent
- Headquarters: Wilbur J. Cohen Federal Building Washington, D.C.
- Annual budget: $810 million (FY 2022)
- Agency executive: Michael Rigas, Acting CEO
- Website: www.usagm.gov
- Agency ID: 9568

The United States Agency for Global Media (USAGM), known as the Broadcasting Board of Governors (BBG) from 1994 to 2018, is an independent agency of the United States government that broadcasts news and information for regions of the world with the lowest levels of press freedom.

The USAGM supervises Voice of America (VOA) and Office of Cuba Broadcasting as well as state-funded Radio Free Europe/Radio Liberty, Radio Free Asia, Middle East Broadcasting Networks and Open Technology Fund. Many ascribe to Radio Free Europe/Radio Liberty a contribution to the dissolution of the Soviet Union and Radio Free Asia for breaking the story on Xinjiang re-education camps.

On March 14, 2025, President Donald Trump issued Executive Order 14238 that directed that the USAGM be eliminated "to the maximum extent consistent with applicable law", along with several other agencies. Between March and July 2025, 85% of the staff at USAGM and its subsidiaries were eliminated, leaving only 250 employees across the USAGM, VOA and the Office of Cuba Broadcasting. Only the OCB's complement of 33 employees has remained intact.

Due to these developments' erosion of its independence, State Media Monitor has since 2025 classified the USAGM and its outlets as state-controlled media, characterized as "media in which the government retains a major role [..,] controlling their management and closely supervising their editorial agenda".

== History ==
=== Early years ===
The Broadcasting Board of Governors (BBG) was formed in 1994 with the passing of the International Broadcasting Act. The act established a bipartisan board that consisted of nine voting members, eight of whom were to be appointed by the president for a three–year term. The ninth was the secretary of state, also a political appointee, who would serve as an ex officio board member for the duration of their term as secretary. At this point, BBG was considered a part of the United States Information Agency.

The first voting members of the BBG, confirmed on August 11, 1995, were David W. Burke, Ted Kaufman, Tom C. Korologos, Bette Bao Lord, Alberto J. Mora, Cheryl Halpern, Marc Nathanson, and Carl Spielvogel.

On October 1, 1999, the BBG was established as an independent agency by the Foreign Affairs Reform and Restructuring Act of 1998.

The Agency has five broadcasting entities that were established from 1942 to 2004. The Voice of America (VOA) has been in operation since World War II. William Harlan Hale, a journalist and writer, began the VOA's first radio show by saying "We bring you voices from America. Today, and daily from now on, we shall speak to you about America and the War. The news may be good for us. The news may be bad. But we shall tell you the truth."

Then, in 1950, Radio Free Europe/Radio Liberty (RFE/RL) went on the air. The Office of Cuba Broadcasting (OCB) was started in 1985. Radio Free Asia (RFA) was founded in 1996.

It has been considered an arm of U.S. public diplomacy.

=== 2000–2017 ===
In 2002, BBG launched Radio Sawa, a 24/7 Arabic language radio network that broadcasts news and a mix of Western and Arabic music in the Middle East.

In 2004, Alhurra TV was created as a televised sister network to Radio Sawa and began broadcasting throughout the Middle East. Since its founding, it has established programs such as Al Youm (Today in English), a daily three-hour news program broadcast from five countries on three different continents; and Musawat (Equality in English), a program that focuses on women's issues and rights in the Arab world.

To oversee Arabic broadcasts, the Middle East Broadcasting Network, Inc (MBN) was initiated in 2005.

Other networks were also expanded under the BBG. Voice of America worked with Radio Free Europe/Radio Liberty to launch Radio Farda, a Persian-language radio program targeting youth. In 2006, VOA initiated TV Ashna, a one-hour televised news broadcast, and Radio Deewa, a daily radio program of sports, music, and local and international news.

In a January 2015 interview with The New York Times, the then newly appointed CEO of the BBG, Andrew Lack, said "We are facing a number of challenges from entities like Russia Today which is out there pushing a point of view, the Islamic State in the Middle East and groups like Boko Haram. But I firmly believe that this agency has a role to play in facing those challenges."

The board of USAGM has an advisory role. It previously supervised USAGM media networks directly, but was replaced with a single appointed chief executive officer (CEO) as part of the National Defense Authorization Act for Fiscal Year 2017, passed in December 2016.

=== 2018–present ===
In 2018, the BBG changed its name to the U.S. Agency for Global Media (USAGM). The name change was initiated to help constituents better understand what USAGM does.

The Open Technology Fund (OTF), launched in 2012, works to advance internet freedom, so USAGM journalists and audiences can have uncensored internet access. Over 2 billion people worldwide use OTF-supported technologies daily.

The agency has $2 million earmarked for the 2019–20 Hong Kong protests through the Open Technology Fund. This funding was frozen in June 2020 as China was preparing to introduce a new national security law for Hong Kong.

State Department Spokeswoman Jen Psaki clarified Lack's statement in her January 23 press briefing, saying "would the U.S. Government put those three in the same category? No, we wouldn't. However, there are concerns...that Russia's own independent media space is shrinking and the Kremlin continues to apply pressure on the few remaining outlets."

On January 19, 2021, the nonprofit Government Accountability Project, representing fired USAGM employees and whistleblowers, sent a letter to the congressional foreign affairs committees, the U.S. Office of Special Counsel, and the Inspector General of the US Department of State. The letter said that Pack had hired the McGuireWoods law firm to investigate USAGM employees and the OTF at a cost of over $2 million in the last quarter of 2020, bypassing US government investigators including USAGM's own Office of Human Resources, and called for further investigation of what it termed a gross misuse of taxpayer dollars. The Washington Post later reported that a second law firm, Caplin & Drysdale, had also been granted a similar no-bid contract in possible violation of federal contracting regulations for a total cost of $4 million.

On January 20, 2021, journalist Kelu Chao was appointed acting CEO of the USAGM, replacing outgoing CEO Michael Pack.

In September 2022, Amanda Bennett, a journalist and Pulitzer Prize-winning author, received bipartisan confirmation by the U.S. Senate to become CEO. Bennett was sworn in as CEO on December 6, 2022.

As of 2024, USAGM had an average weekly audience of 427 million with broadcasts in 63 languages.

On January 22, 2025, President Trump named a conservative critic of the mainstream media, L. Brent Bozell III, as his pick to run the USAGM. In March, Trump withdrew this nomination and nominated Bozell as ambassador to South Africa.

In March, Elon Musk's Department of Government Efficiency (DOGE) imposed a 30-day total freeze on funding to Radio Free Europe/Radio Liberty, Radio Free Asia, and the Middle East Broadcasting Network, among other USAGM outlets, with the intention of making that permanent. President Trump subsequently ordered the gutting of USAGM to the maximum extent allowed by law in a March 14 executive order. On March 15, journalists from VOA, RFE/RL, and other American-funded media outlets were placed on leave. Critics claimed the order weakens American influence and strengthens America's authoritarian adversaries who are increasing their information warfare efforts, while the White House justified it as cutting taxpayer-funded propaganda.

On March 7, 2026, U.S. District Judge Royce Lamberth ruled Lake was ineligible to serve as acting CEO of USAGM from her appointment the previous July to her resignation on Nov. 19. The judge invalidated all actions taken by Lake during that period, including layoffs. Actions taken by Lake when the previous CEO, Victor Morales, delegated his responsibilities to her were also void. Lake accused Lamberth of a "pattern of activist rulings" and said the administration would appeal.

== Leadership ==
USAGM is led by a single chief executive officer appointed by the president of the United States and confirmed by the U.S. Senate. Until 2016, it was headed by a bi-partisan board with nine members; eight were appointed by the president with Senate confirmation, and the ninth member ex officio was the Secretary of State. By law, no more than four members could be from the same political party, in an effort to limit partisanship. The president designated one member (other than the Secretary of State) to serve as chairman. The board served as a "firewall" against political interference in the journalistic product.

Upon the enactment of the National Defense Authorization Act for Fiscal Year 2017 on December 23, 2016 the agency was placed under the direction of a single CEO. The board, officially renamed as the International Broadcasting Advisory Board, was reduced to five members appointed by the president to serve in an advisory role. Previously appointed board members in excess of five could continue to serve, but would not be replaced when their term expired. Under the 2016 reform legislation, any new agency CEO is to be nominated by the U.S. president and confirmed by the U.S. Senate with authority to select key agency personnel. Former USAGM CEO John F. Lansing, who had been selected and approved in 2015 by the BBG board holding a Democratic majority during the Obama administration, was not nominated by President Obama nor confirmed by the Republican-controlled U.S. Senate, as this was not required under previous legislation.

In June 2018, President Trump announced his intention to nominate documentary film producer Michael Pack to head the agency. He was confirmed by the Senate two years later, and served from June 5, 2020, until January 20, 2021, when he was asked to resign at the request of newly inaugurated President Joe Biden. President Biden then appointed Kelu Chao as acting USAGM CEO.

President Biden then nominated Amanda Bennett for CEO. She received bipartisan confirmation from the U.S. Senate in September 2022 and was sworn into the position in December 2022.

=== International Broadcasting Advisory Board ===
The board advises the CEO of the agency, as appropriate. It is composed of seven members, six appointed by the president of the United States with the consent of the United States Senate, and the U.S. Secretary of State. Of the six appointed members, one each should be appointed from among four lists of at least three individuals submitted by the chairs and ranking members of the House Committee on Foreign Affairs and Senate Committee on Foreign Relations. All six members shall not be regular, full-time employees of the U.S. government, and be appointed on the basis of being distinguished in the fields of public diplomacy, mass communications, print, broadcast or digital media, or foreign affairs. These six are appointed to a single term of four years, but they may continue to serve on the board until a successor is confirmed. Only three of these may be affiliated with the same political party.

The president designates one member to serve as chairperson, with the advice and consent of the Senate. A majority of the members of the board constitutes a quorum, when excluding the secretary of state.

On January 3, 2025, President Joe Biden issued a memorandum designating an order of succession for officials of the agency to act as CEO in the event the office falls vacant. This memorandum was revoked by Donald Trump on January 20, the first day of his second presidency. Additionally, Trump reportedly dismissed the board members of the International Broadcasting Advisory Board during his first week in office. USAGM announced in early 2025 that Kari Lake would serve as a special advisor. Lake had previously called for imprisoning journalists whose reporting she called "lies".

=== Current board members ===
The current board members as of May 24, 2026:

| Position | Name | Party | Assumed office | Term expiration |
|---|---|---|---|---|
| Chair | Vacant | | | |
| Member | Vacant | | | |
| Member | Vacant | | | |
| Member | Vacant | | | |
| Member | Vacant | | | |
| Member | Vacant | | | |
| Member (ex officio) | Marco Rubio | Republican | January 21, 2025 | — |

== Outlets ==
- Voice of America
- Radio Free Europe/Radio Liberty
  - Current Time TV
- Radio Free Asia
- Middle East Broadcasting Networks
  - Alhurra
  - Radio Sawa
- Office of Cuba Broadcasting (Radio y Televisión Martí)

== Reception ==
In February 2010, BBG Executive Director Jeff Trimble collaborated with the National Security Council to publish a VOA statement about Iran's jamming of international satellites. In an email to Foreign Policy magazine, BBG's Public Affairs Director responded to the controversy, stating "the BBG 'firewall' served to protect the integrity and credibility of our journalistic products. An official policy statement by a senior management official of the agency is not a journalistic product."

Later that year, Senator Tom Coburn held up the Obama administration's appointments of Michael P. Meehan and Dana Perino to the board, with the aim of drawing attention to the organization's perceived ineffectiveness. Senator Jim DeMint also attempted to use the nominations to force a hearing on the BBG after frustrations with a perceived lack of congressional oversight over the organization. A report on BBG was eventually given to the Senate Committee on Foreign Relations and Coburn was unsuccessful in trying to block the appointments to the board.

In July 2016, the chairman of the Broadcasting Board of Governors, Jeff Shell, was denied entry into Russia. Matt Novak, writing for the tech website Gizmodo, referred to the BBG as the "propaganda arm" of the U.S. government and speculated that its alleged role in spreading propaganda on behalf of the U.S. government was the reason Shell was denied entry to Russia.

In 2018, The New York Times reported that the Agency had targeted Americans with Facebook ads for one of its outlets, which would violate the Smith–Mundt Act, a law "to protect Americans from domestic propaganda".

In 2025, The Economist wrote that USAGM had doubled its audience from 2014 to 2024 despite increased competition, which may be due to its perceived trustworthiness. It also helps to boost local independent media in countries with low press freedom. The Reuters Institute for the Study of Journalism wrote that cutting USAGM ceded the information space to autocrats like Russia and China, who celebrated its demise while investing even more in their international efforts to discredit the United States and the west.

== See also ==
- List of federal agencies in the United States
- Title 22 of the Code of Federal Regulations
