= List of contributors to Project 2025 =

Directed by the Heritage Foundation, the 2025 Presidential Transition Project (or Project 2025) rests on "four pillars": a policy guide, a "conservative LinkedIn", a "Presidential Administration Academy", and a "playbook". The policy guide has been published in April 2024 as a volume of the Mandate for Leadership series, under the name The Conservative Promise. Edited by Paul Dans and Steven Groves, the more than 900-page volume features 30 chapters written by 40 primary authors.

More than 100 organizations, spanning from conservative to far-right, have helped produce the Conservative Promise, and Project 2025 more generally. The policy reforms promoted in it and its digest have gained traction during the 2024 US presidential election. Many collaborators of Donald Trump have been tied to the project.

== Background ==
Trump attended an event for Heritage in Amelia Island, Florida, on April 21, 2022, and praised its forthcoming Project 2025, saying:

[T]hey're going to lay the groundwork and detail plans for exactly what our movement will do and what your movement will do when the American people give us a colossal mandate to save America and that's coming. That's coming. Because nobody can stand what's happening right now. Only a fool, only a fool or somebody that hates our country can like what's happening right now. Never been in this position before and already we know a very big part of our agenda.

During his 2024 political campaign Trump faced political pressure for his association with Project 2025; he started to disavow it by July. Soon after, Dans resigned from Project 2025, a symbolic gesture since it published its deliverables, including a database of 10,000 conservative job candidates. Dans later criticized senior advisors Susie Wiles and Chris LaCivita for 'historic campaign malpractice'. LaCivita floated the idea that Project 2025 members would be barred from serving in the second Trump administration.

On August 15, 2024, CNN published a video in which British journalists made Russell Vought reveal his policy preparation for a Trump presidency, his views on unitary executive theory, and his Christian nationalism. While still distancing himself from Project 2025, Trump headlined a Moms for Liberty event sponsored by Heritage at the end of August.

Heritage stated that Trump has previously embraced many of the policy recommendations put forward by that organization. Several contributors to the project have held positions in one of Trump's political campaigns or his administrations.

== Advisory board ==
The Conservative Promise has an "Advisory board" section in its front matter. Those featured in the Conservative promise with no collaborator are:

- Alabama Policy Institute
- American Accountability Foundation
- American Council of Trustees and Alumni
- Center for Equal Opportunity
- Concerned Women for America
- Family Policy Alliance
- First Liberty Institute
- Forge Leadership Network
- Foundation for Defense of Democracies
- Foundation for Government Accountability
- Honest Elections Project
- Institute for the American Worker
- Intercollegiate Studies Institute
- James Madison Institute
- Leadership Institute
- Liberty University
- National Association of Scholars
- National Center for Public Policy Research
- Pacific Research Institute
- Patrick Henry College
- Personnel Policy Operations
- Teneo Network
- Young America's Foundation

Heritage maintained a website from April 2023 to March 2025. The organizations listed during that time changed. The number listed in press releases varied from 21 in June 2022 to more than 100 in February 2024; after Trump's disavowal of Project 2025, many advisory board members were scrubbed from the website, including America First Legal, an organization founded by Stephen Miller.

== Authors ==
The 30 chapters of the Conservative Promise have been authored by 40 people. Many have contributed to chapters they have not authored. The Heritage president wrote the foreword, and one of its co-founders wrote the afterword. Of these authors and editors, the New York Times found that by October 2024, 18 have served in the first Trump administration. The Revolving Door Project counted that 25 of the 30 chapters have been written by former Trump officials. Since then other ties have been found.

Organizations marked with a dagger (†) are listed in the "Advisory board" section of the Conservative Promise.

Name	Affiliations	Chapter or matter	Trump ties
Daren Bakst	Competitive Enterprise Institute (CEI) †; Heartland Institute; Federalist Society	10 – "Department of Agriculture"	
Jonathan Berry	Heritage; † Boyden Gray; Federalist Society	18 – "Department of Labor and Related Agencies"	DOJ (2017–2018), DOL (2018–2020) transition team (2024); DOL (2025-)
Robert Benedict Bowes		27 – "Financial Regulatory Agencies / Consumer Financial Protection Bureau"	Campaign director (2016), HUD (2017–2021), OPM, CFTC withdrawn nomination (2020)
Lindsey M. Burke	Heritage; † EdChoice	11 – "Department of Education"	ED (2025)
David R. Burton	Heritage; † Federalist Society	22 – "Department of the Treasury"; 27 – "Financial Regulatory Agencies / Securities and Exchange Commission and Related Agencies"; 25 – "Small Business Administration" (contributor)	
Adam Candeub	Federalist Society; Michigan State University	30 – "Federal Trade Commission"	DOC; DOJ deputy associate attorney general; FCC general counsel
Dustin J. Carmack	Heritage †; Meta	7 – "Intelligence Community"	DNI chief of staff
Brendan Carr	Federal Communications Commission (FCC)	28 – "Federal Communications Commission"	FCC (2017–2027)
Ben Carson	American Cornerstone Institute †	15 – "Department of Housing and Urban Development"	HUD secretary; Establishment of the Religious Liberty Commission
Ken Cuccinelli	Heritage †, visiting fellow	5 – "Department of Homeland Security"	USCIS director; DHS deputy secretary
Paul Dans	Heritage †: Project 2025 director (stepped down)	3 – "Central Personnel Agencies: Managing the Bureaucracy" ; 6 – "Department of State" (contributor)	HUD (2019); OPM chief of staff (2020)
Rick Dearborn	Cypress Group	1 – "White House Office"	Transition team executive director (2016); deputy chief of staff (2017–2018)
Veronique de Rugy	Mercatus Center; Cato Institute	23 – "Export-Import Bank / The Export-Import Bank Should be Abolished"	
Donald J. Devine	The Fund for American Studies	3 – "Central Personnel Agencies: Managing the Bureaucracy" 1 – "White House Office" (contributor)	OPM advisor during the first administration
Edwin J. Feulner	Heritage † co-founder	Afterword – "Onward!"	Transition team (2016)
Diana Furchtgott-Roth	Heritage †	19 – "Department of Transportation"	Deputy Assistant Secretary for Research and Technology
Thomas F. Gilman	American Center for Law & Justice †	21 – "Department of Commerce"	DOC chief financial officer and assistant secretary for administration;
Mike Gonzalez	Heritage †	8 – "Media Agencies / Corporation for Public Broadcasting"; 21 – "Department of Commerce" (contributor)	1776 Commission appointee
Mandy M. Gunasekara	Independent Women's Forum †	13 – "Environmental Protection Agency"	EPA chief of staff and principal deputy assistant administrator for the Office of air and radiation
Gene Hamilton	America First Legal †	17 – "Department of Justice"	DOJ counselor to the attorney general; DHS senior counselor; ICE assistant chief counsel
Jennifer L. Hazelton	CNN and Fox News journalist	23 – "Export-Import Bank / The Case for the Export-Import Bank"	Trump-Pence Georgia campaign Communications director (2016); DOS head of Public Affairs (2017); EXIM vice president (2017–2020); USAID deputy assistant administrator (2020–2021)
Karen Kerrigan	Small Business & Entrepreneurship Council	25 – "Small Business Administration"	Supported Trump's nomination of Linda McMahon
Dennis D. Kirk	Mindset	3 – "Central Personnel Agencies – Managing the Bureaucracy"	OPM associate director; Merit Systems Protection Board chairman
Kent Lassman	Competitive Enterprise Institute †	26 – "Trade / The Case for Free Trade"	
Bernard L. McNamee	McGuireWoods LLP	12 – "Department of Energy and Related Commissions"	FERC
Christopher C. Miller	Albers Aerospace, Highpoint Aerotechnologies	4 – "Department of Defense"	DoD secretary (2020); NCC director (2020); NSC (2018–2019)
Stephen Moore	FreedomWorks †	22 – "Department of the Treasury"	Member of President Trump's economic task force
Mora Namdar	Namdar Law PLLC	8 – "Media Agencies / United States Agency for Global Media"	NEA senior bureau official (2025); USAGM; CA assistant secretary (2020–2021)
Peter Navarro	Paul Merage School of Business (gone emeritus)	26 – "Free Trade / The Case for Fair Trade"	Assistant to the President; OTMP director; NTC director
William Perry Pendley	Federalist Society; Mountain States Legal Foundation	16 – "Department of the Interior"	BLM de facto director (2019–2020)
Max Primorac	Heritage †	9 – "Agency for International Development"; 6 – "Department of State" (contributor)	USAID chief operating officer
Kevin Roberts	Heritage † president	Foreword – "A Promise to America"	Met with Trump; organized events around him.
Roger Severino	Ethics and Public Policy Center	14 – "Department of Health and Human Services"	Office of Civil Rights director at HHS
Brett D. Schaefer	Heritage †	6 – "Department of State"	Member on the United Nations committee on contributions
Kiron K. Skinner	Pepperdine University School of Public Policy	6 – "Department of State"	DOS director of policy planning
Brooks D. Tucker	United States Marine Corps (retired lieutenant)	20 – "Department of Veterans Affairs"	VA assistant secretary for congressional and legislative affairs
Hans A. von Spakovsky	Heritage †	29 – "Federal Election Commission"	Presidential Advisory Commission on Election Integrity (2017)
Russell "Russ" Vought	Center for Renewing America (CRA) †	2 – "Executive Office of the President of the United States"	OMB director (2018–2020, 2025-); 2024 Republican National Committee Platform
William L. Walton	Resolute Protector Foundation	22 – "Department of the Treasury"	Transition team top economic advisor (2016)
Paul Winfree	Economic Policy Innovation Center (EPIC); Heritage †	24 – "Federal Reserve"; 2 – "Executive Office of the President of the United States" (contributor)	DPC; OMB; Fulbright Foreign Scholarship Board (2019–2022)

== Other contributors ==
The editors of Conservative Promise thank their 280 contributors in an "Acknowledgements" section, and lists them as "contributors". Other contributors have earned a special mention in the author's notes at the end of their chapters. Some contributors (like Atkins) have been thanked for having written portions of the chapters, but are not listed as author. Those who have not contributed to any specific chapter are identified as appearing in the "Contributors" section. The New York Times has traced back 307 authors and contributors to Project 2025; 182 of them are tied to Trump.

Organizations marked with a dagger (†) are listed in the "Advisory board" section of the Conservative Promise.

Other Conservative Promise contributors
Name	Affiliation	Chapter	Trump tie
Paige Agostin	Center for Renewing America †	2 – "Executive Office of the President of the United States"	Associate Director of Policy for the Office of the Vice President (2020–2024)
Mark Albrecht		"Contributors"	
Christopher J. Anderson	Sen. Steve Daines (2022–); Sen. Bill Cassidy (2014–2017)	20 – "Department of Veterans Affairs"	VA (2017–2021); testified to the 2019 impeachment inquiry
Jeffrey H. Anderson	The American Main Street Initiative †	"Contributors"	DOJ: director of the Bureau of Justice Statistics (2017–2021)
Michael Anton	Hillsdale College †	2 – "Executive Office of the President of the United States"	NCS: deputy assistant to the President for strategic communications
EJ Antoni III	Heritage †	22 – "Department of Treasury" (cited)	Commissioner of Labor Statistics nominee, withdrawn
Andrew R. Arthur	Center for Immigration Studies †	"Contributors" (identified as "Art")	Defended Trump's anti-immigration policies in reports and hearings.
Paul S. Atkins	Patomak Global Partners	27 – "Financial Regulatory Agencies / Securities and Exchange Commission and Related Agencies" (portion)	SEC chairman (2025 – ); Strategic and Policy Forum (2017)
Julie Axelrod	Center for Immigration Studies †	"Contributors"	EPA (2020–2021)
James Bacon		"Contributors"	McEntee's aide
James Baehr	Pelican Institute; Federalist Society	"Contributors"	General counsel for the Department of Veteran Affairs
Stewart Baker	Steptoe and Johnson LLP	"Contributors"	Testified for FISA reform.
Erik Baptist	Alliance Defending Freedom †	"Contributors"	EPA (2017)
Brent Bennett	Texas Public Policy Foundation †; FedSoc; Life:Powered	12 – "Department of Energy and Related Commissions"	
John Berlau	CEI †	22 – "Department of Treasury"	Endorsed Trump's choice for CFPB director
Russell Berman	Hoover Institution	6 – "Department of State"	U.S. State Department: Commission on Unalienable Rights in the first Trump administration
Aubrey Bettencourt	Netafim	16 – "Department of the Interior"	USDA under his first administration; NRCS (2025-)
Sanjai Bhagat	University of Colorado Boulder	"Contributors"	Part of the Economists for Trump
Stephen Billy	Susan B. Anthony Pro-Life America †	2 – "Executive Office of the President of the United States"	OMB senior advisor
Brad Bishop	American Cornerstone Institute	"Contributors"	HUD deputy assistant communications secretary
Willis W. Bixby	WWBX LLC; Talisman	12 – "Department of Energy and Related Commissions"	DOE (2018)
Josh Blackman	South Texas College of Law	"Contributors"	
Jim Blew	Defense of Freedom Institute †	11 – "Department of Education"	ED: assistant secretary for planning, evaluation and policy development
Robert Bortins	Classical Conversations	"Contributors"	
Rachel Bovard	Conservative Partnership Institute †	30 – "Federal Trade Commission"	Endorsed Trump in various right-wing outlets.
Matt Bowman	Alliance Defending Freedom †	"Contributors"	HHS deputy general counsel
Steven G. Bradbury	Heritage †	19 – "Department of Transportation"	Acting Secretary of Transportation; acting Deputy Secretary of Transportation; general Counsel of the United States Department of Transportation
Preston Brashers	Heritage †	22 – "Department of Treasury" (thanked and cited)	
Andrew Bremberg	Victims of Communism Memorial Foundation	1 – "White House Office"	Office of the United Nations in Geneva: permanent US representative; DPC: assistant to the President
Jonathan Bronitsky	ATHOS	1 – "White House Office"	Former chief speech writer for William P. Barr, the 2016–2020 Trump administration's attorney general
Kyle Brosnan	Heritage †	"Contributors"	HHS and DHS: senior roles
Patrick T. Brown	Ethics and Public Policy Center †	"Contributors"	Defended Trump with op-eds
Robert Burkett	American Center for Law & Justice	2 – "Executive Office of the President of the United States"; 21 – "Department of Commerce"	DOC; DOL; Office of the Under Secretary chief of staff
Michael Burley	American Cornerstone Institute	"Contributors"	Special assistant to the president and associate director of presidential personnel
Jonathan Butcher	Heritage †	11 – "Department of Education"	
Mark H. Buzby	Buzby Maritime Associates, LLC	"Contributors"	United States Maritime Administrator
Margaret Byfield	American Stewards of Liberty	"Contributors"	Involved in the Congressional Western Caucus; lobbied against national parks
David Byrd	Korn Ferry	"Contributors"	Transition team consultant; DOCnational deputy director
Sarah Calvis	America Moment †	6 – "Department of State";	Project 2025 coordinator (2022 – 2025)
Anthony P. Campau	Center for Renewing America †; EPIC	2 – "Executive Office of the President of the United States"	Presidential transition team
James Jay Carafano	Heritage †	6 – "Department of State"	Primary aide to the U.S. State Department for the first Trump administration's transition team
Frank Carroll	Professional Forest Management	"Contributors"	Wanted to rename State Route 260 the Donald Trump Highway.
Oren Cass	American Compass†	18 – "Department of Labor and Related Agencies"	Worked with JD Vance
Brian J. Cavanaugh	American Global Strategies	"Contributors"	National Security Council (2017–2021)
Spencer Chretien	Heritage †: Project 2025 associate director	6 – "Department of State"	2019–2020 EOP; HUD 2025– senior bureau official at PRM
Claire Christensen	American Cornerstone Institute; Gingrich 360	"Contributors"	Co-authored Trump vs China with Newt Gingrich
Jeffrey B. Clark	New Civil Liberties Alliance; Federalist Society	2 – "Executive Office of the President of the United States"	United States Assistant Attorney General for the Environment and Natural Resources Division. Acting Administrator of the Office of Information and Regulatory Affairs at the Office of Management and Budget.
Victoria Coates	Heritage †	8 – "Media Agencies / Corporation for Public Broadcasting"	Deputy National Security Advisor for Middle East and North African Affairs
Ellie Cohanim	Independent Women's Forum †	"Contributors"	Special Envoy to Combat Antisemitism in the first Trump administration
Ezra Cohen	Union League of Philadelphia	"Contributors"	DOD
Elbridge Colby	Marathon Initiative	"Contributors"	Deputy Assistant Secretary of Defense for Strategy and Force Development in the first Trump administration
Earl Comstock	White & Case LLP	"Contributors"	DOC: Wilbur Ross aide (2017–2020)
Wesley Coopersmith	Heritage Action for America	6 – "Department of State"	Legislative Director for Sen. Kelly Loeffler (R-GA)
Lisa Correnti	Center for Family and Human Rights (C-Fam) †	"Contributors"	Delegate to the U.N. Commission on the Status of Women
Monica Crowley	The Nixon Seminar	22 – "Department of Treasury"	Assistant Secretary of the Treasury for Public Affairs in first the Trump administration
Laura Cunliffe	Independent Women's Forum † America First Policy Institute	2 – "Executive Office of the President of the United States"	United Nations ambassador chief of staff; OMB; DPC
Mark Cruz	United States Energy Association	16 – "Department of the Interior"	DOI (2018–2020); HHS senior advisor (2025)
Tom Dans	Amberwave Partners	22 – "Department of Treasury"	USDT: counselor to the under secretary for international affairs
Sohan Dasgupta	Taft Stettinius & Hollister LLP	"Contributors"	DHS: Assistant secretary for trade and economic security (2025); previously ED: Special counsel, and DHS: Deputy general counsel
Corey DeAngelis	American Federation for Children	"Contributors"	Trump endorsed his anti-LGBTQ+ book
Caroline DeBerry	Paragon Health Institute vice-president (2021–2023)	"Contributors"	FEC; worked for Pence's Chief of Staff Nick Ayers, Brett Giroir,
Arielle Del Turco	Family Research Council †	"Contributors"	
Chris De Ruyter	National Center for Urban Operations	"Contributors"	
Irv Dennis	American Cornerstone Institute	"Contributors"	HUD chief financial officer
David Deptula	Mitchell Institute for Aerospace Studies	"Contributors"	
Sergio de la Peña		4: "Department of Defense"	Deputy Assistant Secretary of Defense for Western Hemisphere Affairs in the first Trump Administration 2016 presidential campaign
Chuck DeVore	Texas Public Policy Foundation †	4: "Department of Defense"	
C. Wallace DeWitt	Allen & Overy LLP	27 – "Financial Regulatory Agencies / Consumer Financial Protection Bureau"	SEC counsel to the commissioner
Matthew D. Dickerson	EPIC; Heritage †; Americans for Prosperity	"Contributors"	House Budget Committee senior policy advisor
James Di Pane	Heritage †	"Contributors"	
Michael Ding	America First Legal †	"Contributors"	
David Ditch	Heritage †	19 – "Department of Transportation"	
Natalie Dodson	Ethics and Public Policy Center †	"Contributors"	Senior counselor to the HHS secretary
Dave Dorey	The Fairness Center	"Contributors"	DHS: deputy assistant secretary for counterterrorism and threat prevention
Mike Duffey	Senior Vice Chancellor of the Ohio Department of Higher Education	2 – "Executive Office of the President of the United States"	Senior White House official
Max Eden	American Enterprise Institute	11 – "Department of Education"	
Troy Edgar	IBM Consulting	"Contributors"	DHS chief financial officer
Joseph Edlow	Heritage †	"Contributors"	USCIS deputy director
Jen Ehlinger	Booz Allen Hamilton	"Contributors"	DoS communications strategist
John Ehrett	Office of Senator Josh Hawley	30 – "Federal Trade Commission"	
Kristen Eichamer	Heritage †	21 – "Department of Commerce"	NASA deputy press secretary
Robert S. Eitel	Defense of Freedom Institute †	11 – "Department of Education"	ED: counselor to the secretary
Lanny Erdos		16 – "Department of the Interior"	
Will Estrada	Parents Rights Foundation	"Contributors"	
Farnaz Farkish Thompson	McGuireWoods	"Contributors"	ED (2018–2021)
Jon Feere	Center for Immigration Studies †	"Contributors"	ICE senior advisor; collaborated with Miller and Holman to hype immigrant criminality
Baruch Feigenbaum	Reason Foundation	"Contributors"	
Travis Fisher	Heritage †	12 – "Department of Energy and Related Commissions"	
George Fishman	Center for Immigration Studies †	"Contributors"	DHS deputy general counsel and USCIS] chief counsel (2018–2021)
Leslie Ford	Heritage †; American Enterprise Institute (2023–)	"Contributors"	DPC
Aharon Friedman	Federal Policy Group	"Contributors"	USDT: senior adviser to the assistant secretary for tax policy
Bruce Frohnen	Pettit College of Law; Federalist Society	"Contributors"	
Joel Frushone	Ernst & Young	"Contributors"	EDA (2019–2021)
Finch Fulton	K&L Gates	"Contributors"	DOT (2019–2020)
Caleigh Gabel	American Cornerstone Institute	"Contributors"	
Christopher Gacek	Family Research Council †	"Contributors"	
Alexandra Gaiser	River Financial Inc.	"Contributors"	
Mario Garza		"Contributors"	
Patty-Jane Geller	Heritage †	4 – "Department of Defense" and 12 – "Department of Energy and Related Commissions" (cited)	
Aurelia Giacometto		16 – "Department of the Interior"	United States Fish and Wildlife Service director
Andrew Gillen	Texas Public Policy Foundation †	11 – "Department of Education"	
James S. Gilmore III	Gilmore Global Group LLC	"Contributors"	served as United States Mission to the United States Ambassador to the Organization for Security and Cooperation in Europe during the first Trump administration
Vance Ginn	Economic Consulting LLC	2 – "Executive Office of the President of the United States"	
John G. Malcolm	Heritage †	"Contributors"	LSC board of directors, nominated by Trump (2019-)
Alma Golden	Institute for Women's Health †	9 – "Agency for International Development"	
Chadwick R. Gore	Defense Forum Foundation	"Contributors"	Donald J. Trump for President inc. (2016); House Foreign Affairs Committee (2018–2019)
David Gortler	Ethics and Public Policy Center †	"Contributors"	
Brian Gottstein	Heritage †	"Contributors"	
Dan Greenberg	CEI †	"Contributors"	
Robert "Rob" Greenway	Hudson Institute	2 – "Executive Office of the President of the United States"	Top advisor on the Middle East who stepped down following January 6
Rachel Greszler	Heritage †; EPIC	18 – "Department of Labor and Related Agencies"	Senior economist on the staff of the Joint Economic Committee of the Congress
DJ Gribbin	Madrus Consulting	"Contributors"	Special assistant to the President for infrastructure (2017–2018)
Garrison Grisedale	American Cornerstone Institute; Hillsdale College †	"Contributors"	HUD: Speechwriter and Deputy White House Liaison
Joseph Grogan	USC Schaeffer School for Health Policy and Economics	"Contributors"	Domestic Policy Council during the first Trump administration
Steven Groves	Heritage †, The Conservative Promise co-editor	6 – "Department of State" (contributor)	Ambassador Nikki Haley's Chief of Staff at the U.S. Mission to the United Nations Assistant Special Counsel, representing the White House in the Mueller investigation White House Deputy Press Secretary
Andrew Guernsey	Voice for Life	"Contributors"	HHS senior advisor
Jeffrey Gunter	Republican Jewish Coalition	"Contributors"	
Joe Guy	Club for Growth	"Contributors"	
Joseph Guzman		"Contributors"	
Amalia Halikias	Heritage †	"Contributors"	
Casey Hammond		16 – "Department of the Interior"	BLM acting director
Richard Hanania	Center for the Study of Partisanship and Ideology	"Contributors"	
Simon Hankinson	Heritage †	6 – "Department of State"	State Department
David Harlow		13 – "Environmental Protection Agency"	
Derek Harvey	Board of County Commissioners in Washington County, Maryland (2022–2026)	"Contributors"	National Security Council (2017); HPSCI (2017–2018)
Jason Hayes	Mackinac Center for Public Policy	"Contributors"	
Aaron Hedlund	America First Policy Institute	2 – "Executive Office of the President of the United States"	Chief Economist for Domestic Policy at the Council of Economic Advisers.
Lou Heinzer		21 – "Department of Commerce"	
Edie Heipel	Center for Renewing America †	2 – "Executive Office of the President of the United States"	
Troup Hemenway	Personnel Policy Operations; America First Policy Institute; Club for Growth	"Contributors"	PPO
Nathan Hitchen	Equal Rights Institute	22 – "Department of the Treasury"; (cited)	
Pete Hoekstra		11 – "Department of Education" (cited)	United States Ambassador to the Netherlands during the first Trump administration
Gabriella Hoffman	Independent Women's Forum	13 – "Environmental Protection Agency" (cited)	
Tom Homan	Heritage †	"Contributors"	Director of the Immigration and Customs Enforcement (ICE) during the first Trump administration; Border Czar in the second Trump administration
Christopher C. Horner		"Contributors"	
Mike Howell	Heritage †	"Contributors"	
Valerie Huber	The Institute for Women's Health; † Ascend	2 – "Executive Office of the President of the United States"	Health and Human Services
Andrew Hughes	American Cornerstone Institute	"Contributors"	
Joseph M. Humire	Center for a Secure Free Society	6 – "Department of State"	U.S. Deputy Assistant Secretary of Defense for Homeland Defense Integration and Defense Support of Civil Authorities
Christopher Iacovella	American Securities Association	27 – "Financial Regulatory Agencies / Consumer Financial Protection Bureau"; 30 – "Federal Trade Commission"	
Melanie Israel	Heritage †	"Contributors"	
Ken Ivory	Utah House of Representatives	"Contributors"	
Roman Jankowski	Heritage †	"Contributors"	
Abby Jones		"Contributors"	
Diane Auer Jones		11 – "Department of Education"	
Art Kleinschmidt	Recovery for America Now Foundation †	2 – "Executive Office of the President of the United States"	SAMHSA; HHS
Paul J. Larkin	Heritage †; Civitas Institute	2 – "Executive Office of the President of the United States"	Defends various Trump actions: the spending pause, the Congressional Review Act, etc.
Emilie Kao	Alliance Defending Freedom†	"Contributors"	
Jared M. Kelson	Boyden Gray & Associates	"Contributors"	
Aaron Kheriaty	Ethics and Public Policy Center †	"Contributors"	
Ali Kilmartin	Alliance Defending Freedom†	"Contributors"	
Julie Kirchner	Federation for American Immigration Reform	"Contributors"	
Dan Kish	Institute for Energy Research †	16 – "Department of the Interior"	
Kenneth A. Klukowski	Federalist Society	2 – "Executive Office of the President of the United States"	Constitutional rights advisor on the transition team; Justice Department staffer
Brian Knight		27 (portion): "Financial Regulatory Agencies / Securities and Exchange Commission and Related Agencies"	
Adam Korzeniewski	American Principles Project †	22	
Bethany Kozma	Keystone Policy †	9 – "Agency for International Development"	
Matthew Kozma		"Contributors"	Under secretary for intelligence and analysis, DHS (2025)
Julius Krein	American Affairs	"Contributors"	
Stanley Kurtz	Ethics and Public Policy Center †	"Contributors"	
David LaCerte	Baker Botts, LLP	"Contributors"	
Paul R. Lawrence	Lawrence Consulting	20 – "Department of Veterans Affairs"	
James R. Lawrence III	Envisage Law	"Contributors"	
Nathan Leamer	Targeted Victory	"Contributors"	
Karoline Leavitt		Training videos	White House assistant press secretary (2019–2021); worked for MAGA Inc., Trump's super PAC; White House Press Secretary (2025–August 2026)
David Legates	University of Delaware (Ret.)	2 – "Executive Office of the President of the United States"; 21 – "Department of Commerce"	Deputy Assistant Secretary of Commerce for observation and prediction at the NOAA
Marlo Lewis	CEI †	"Contributors"	
Ben Lieberman	CEI †	12 – "Department of Energy and Related Commissions"	
John Ligon		"Contributors"	
Evelyn Lim	American Cornerstone Institute	"Contributors"	
Mario Loyola	CEI †	2 – "Executive Office of the President of the United States"	
Jim Magagna		16 – "Department of the Interior"	
Scott Mason IV		13 – "Environmental Protection Agency"	
Joseph Masterman	Cooper & Kirk PLLC	"Contributors"	
Earl Matthews	The Vandenberg Coalition	"Contributors"	General Counsel of the Department of Defense, held multiple positions in the first Trump administration
Dan Mauler	Heritage Action for America	"Contributors"	
Brian Vaughan McCormack	Edison Electric Institute	2 – "Executive Office of the President of the United States"; 12 – "Department of Energy and Related Commissions"	Among several aides who declined to participate in the 2019 impeachment hearings against Trump; National Security Council
Drew McCall	American Cornerstone Institute	"Contributors"	
Trent McCotter	Boyden Gray & Associates	"Contributors"	
Micah Meadowcroft	The American Conservative†	"Contributors"	
Edwin Meese III	Heritage †	1 – "White House Office"	Presented the Presidential Medal of Freedom by Donald Trump
Jessica Melugin	CEI †	30 – "Federal Trade Commission"	
Frank Mermoud	Orpheus International	"Contributors"	
Mark Miller	Office of Kristi Noem	"Contributors"	Office of Governor Kristi Noem
Cleta Mitchell	Conservative Partnership Institute †	"Contributors"	
Kevin E. Moley		"Contributors"	
Caitlin Moon	American Center for Law & Justice †	"Contributors"	
David Moore	Brigham Young University Law School	"Contributors"	
Clare Morell	Ethics and Public Policy Center †	"Contributors"	
Mark A. Morgan	Heritage †	"Contributors"	served multiple roles in the first Trump administration
Hunter Morgen	American Cornerstone Institute	"Contributors"	
Rachel Morrison	Ethics and Public Policy Center †	18 – "Department of Labor and Related Agencies"	
Jonathan Moy	Heritage †	"Contributors" (junior staffer)	
Casey Mulligan		2 – "Executive Office of the President of the United States"	Chief Economist of the Council of Economic Advisers during the first Trump administration
Iain Murray	CEI †	2 – "Executive Office of the President of the United States"; 21 – "Department of Commerce"; 26 – "Trade / The Case for Free Trade"	
Ryan Nabil	National Taxpayers Union; CEI †	"Contributors"	
Michael Nasi	Jackson Walker LLP	"Contributors"	
Lucien Niemeyer	The Niemeyer Group LLC	"Contributors"	
Nazak Nikakhtar	Wiley Rein LLP	21 – "Department of Commerce"	
Milan "Mitch" Nikolich		"Contributors"	
Kathy Nuebel Kovarik	Sagitta Solutions LLC	"Contributors"	
Matt O'Brien	Immigration Reform Law Institute	"Contributors"	
Caleb Orr	Boyden Gray & Associates	18 – "Department of Labor and Related Agencies"; 25 – "Small Business Administration"	
Ivan Osorio	CEI †	26 – "Trade / The Case for Free Trade"	
Nina Owcharenko Schaefer	Heritage †	14 – "Department of Health and Human Services" (cited)	
Scott Pace		2 – "Executive Office of the President of the United States"	Executive Secretary of the National Space Council during the first Trump administration
Michael Pack	Claremont Institute † CEO (2015–2017)	8 – "Media Agencies / Corporation for Public Broadcasting"	USAGM CEO
Chad Padgett	Bureau of Land Management in Alaska	16 – "Department of the Interior"	
Leah Pedersen	Convergence	"Contributors"	USAID
Michael Pillsbury	Heritage †	6 – "Department of State"	Architect of Trump's policy towards China
Patrick Pizzella	Leadership Institute	"Contributors"	Deputy and acting Secretary of Labor in the first Trump administration
Chelsea Pizzola		27 – "Financial Regulatory Agencies / Consumer Financial Protection Bureau"	
Jim Pond		16 – "Department of the Interior"	
Robert W. Poole Jr.	Reason Foundation founder	19 – "Department of Transportation"	
Kevin Preskenis	Allymar Health Solutions	"Contributors"	Chief of Staff, Office of the chief financial officer and assistant secretary for administration, DOC
Pam Pryor	National Committee for Religious Freedom	"Contributors"	
Thomas Pyle	Institute for Energy Research †	12 – "Department of Energy and Related Commissions"	
Rob Roy Ramey II		16 – "Department of the Interior"	
John Ratcliffe	American Global Strategies	7 – "Intelligence Community" (mentioned and cited)	Director of National Intelligence selected as CIA Director in the second Trump administration
Paul J. Ray	Heritage †	2 – "Executive Office of the President of the United States"	Administrator of the Office of Information and Regulatory Affairs in the first Trump administration
Joseph Reddan	Flexilis Forestry LLC	"Contributors"	
Jay W. Richards	Heritage †	"Contributors"	
Jordan Richardson	Heise Suarez Melville P.A.	"Contributors"	
Jason Richwine	Center for Immigration Studies †	3 – "Central Personnel Agencies – Managing the Bureaucracy" (cited)	Mentioned by Stephen Miller in the Breitbart emails
Shaun Rieley	The American Conservative†	"Contributors"	
Lora Ries	Heritage †	"Contributors"	
Leo Rios		"Contributors"	
Mark Robeck	Energy Evolution Consulting LLC	12 – "Department of Energy and Related Commissions"	
James Rockas	American Center for Law & Justice	2 – "Executive Office of the President of the United States"; 21 – "Department of Commerce"	Election team
Mark Royce	NOVA-Annandale College	"Contributors"	
Reed Rubinstein	America First Legal	6 – "Department of State"	Legal advisor of the Department of State (May, 2025-)
William P. Ruger	American Institute for Economic Research	"Contributors"	Trump's Ambassador to Afghanistan
Austin Ruse	Center for Family and Human Rights (C-Fam) †	"Contributors"	
Brent D. Sadler	Heritage †	4 – "Department of Defense" (cited)	
Alexander William Salter	Texas Tech University	24 – "Federal Reserve"	
Jon Sanders	John Locke Foundation	"Contributors"	
Carla Sands	America First Policy Institute	"Contributors"	Served as United States Ambassador to Denmark during the first Trump administration
David Sauve		"Contributors"	
Kyle E. Scherer		16 – "Department of the Interior"	
Matt Schuck	American Cornerstone Institute	"Contributors"	
Justin Schwab	CGCN Law	13 – "Environmental Protection Agency"	
Jon Schweppe	American Principles Project †	30 – "Federal Trade Commission"	
Marc Scribner	Reason Foundation	"Contributors"	
Darin Selnick	Selnick Consulting	20 – "Department of Veterans Affairs"	
Josh Sewell	Taxpayers for Common Sense	10 – "Department of Agriculture" (cited)	
Kathleen Sgamma	Western Energy Alliance	16 – "Department of the Interior"	
Matt Sharp	Alliance Defending Freedom†	"Contributors"	
Judy Shelton	Independent Institute	24 – "Federal Reserve"	Economic advisor to Trump under his first term
Molly Sikes	Center for Renewing America †	2 – "Executive Office of the President of the United States"	
Nathan Simington		"Contributors"	served as Commissioner of the FCC in the first Trump administration, and continues to serve in that role in the Biden administration
Jeff Smith		6 – "Department of State"	
Loren Smith	Skyline Policy Risk Group	"Contributors"	
Daniel Simmons	Association of Home Appliance Manufacturers	12 – "Department of Energy and Related Commissions"	DOE: assistant secretary for energy efficiency and renewable energy
Zack Smith	Heritage †	"Contributors"	
Thomas W. Spoehr	Heritage †	4 – "Department of Defense" (cited)	
Jack Spencer	Heritage †	12 – "Department of Energy and Related Commissions"	
Adrienne Spero	U.S. House Committee on Homeland Security	"Contributors"	
Christopher Stanley	Functional Government Initiative	"Contributors"	
Paula M. Stannard		"Contributors"	HHS senior counselor (2016–2020); director of the Office for Civil Rights (2025)
Parker Stathatos	Texas Public Policy Foundation †	"Contributors"	
William R. Steiger	Independent consultant	9 – "Agency for International Development"	USAID chief of staff
Kenny Stein	Institute for Energy Research †	"Contributors"	
Robby Stephany Saunders	Coalition for a Prosperous America †	"Contributors"	
Corey Stewart	Stewart PLLC	"Contributors"	
Peter St Onge	Heritage †	24 – "Federal Reserve"	
Mari Stull		"Contributors"	
Katharine T. Sullivan	1792 Exchange †	"Contributors"	
Brett Swearingen	Miller Johnson	"Contributors"	
Michael Sweeney		"Contributors"	
Tara Sweeney		16 – "Department of the Interior"	
Robert Swope		"Contributors"	
Aaron Szabo	CGCN Group	13 – "Environmental Protection Agency"	
Katy Talento	AllBetter Health	"Contributors"	
Hillary Tanoff		6 – "Department of State"	
John Tashuda		16 – "Department of the Interior"	
Tony Tata	Tata Leadership Group LLC	"Contributors"	Senior Official Performing the Duties of Deputy Under Secretary of Defense for Policy in the first Trump administration
Todd Thurman	American Cornerstone Institute	"Contributors"	
Brett Tolman	Tolman Group	"Contributors"	
Kayla M. Tonnessen	Recovery for America Now Foundation †	2 – "Executive Office of the President of the United States"	Chief of staff of the Office of National Drug Control Policy
Joe Trotter	American Legislative Exchange Council †	"Contributors"	
Tevi Troy	Mercatus Center	"Contributors"	
Katie Tubb		12 – "Department of Energy and Related Commissions"; 16 – "Department of the Interior"	
Clayton Tufts	Jefferson Parish Government	"Contributors"	DOC special adviser (2019-2021)
Erin Valdez	Texas Public Policy Foundation †	11 – "Department of Education"	
Mark Vandroff	Navy (ret.)	"Contributors"	NCS senior director for defense policy
Jessica M. Vaughan	Center for Immigration Studies †	"Contributors"	Spoke regularly with the administration. Testified to the House Judiciary Subcommittee on Immigration and Border Security (2018)
John "JV" Venable	Heritage †	"Contributors"	
Morgan Lorraine Viña	Jewish Institute for National Security of America	"Contributors"	
Andrew N. Vollmer	Mercatus Center	27 – "Financial Regulatory Agencies / Securities and Exchange Commission and Related Agencies"; (thanked and cited)	
Greg Walcher	Natural Resources Group LLC	"Contributors"	
David Wallace		16 – "Department of the Interior"	
David M. Walsh	Takota Group	12 – "Department of Energy and Related Commissions"	
Elizabeth Erin Walsh	Heritage †	6 – "Department of State"	Assistant Secretary of Commerce (Global Markets); Director General of the United States Commercial Service; Member of the Trump's presidential transition team
Jacklyn Ward	American Cornerstone Institute	"Contributors"	HUD press secretary (2025 – 02)
Emma Waters	Heritage †	"Contributors"	
Rachael Wilfong	Heritage †	10 – "Department of Agriculture" (got it ready for submission)	
Michael L. Williams	American Cornerstone Institute	"Contributors"	HUD principal deputy general counsel
Aaron Wolff		"Contributors"	
Jonathan Wolfson	Cicero Institute	2 – "Executive Office of the President of the United States"; 18 – "Department of Labor and Related Agencies"	U.S. Department of Labor in the Trump Administration
Alexei Woltornist	ATHOS	"Contributors"	DHS assistant secretary for public affairs
Clint Woods		13 – "Environmental Protection Agency"	
Frank Wuco	Conservative talk radio show in Florida	8 – "Media Agencies / Corporation for Public Broadcasting"	DHS advisor; Department of State; USAGM
Cesar Ybarra	FreedomWorks †	"Contributors"	
Ryan Young		26 – "Trade / The Case for Free Trade"	
John Zadrozny	America First Legal †	6 – "Department of State"	USCIS official
Gregory Zerzan		16 – "Department of the Interior"	
Laura Zorc	FreedomWorks †	"Contributors"	

== See also ==
- 2024 Republican Party Platform
- Agenda 47 – Policy platform of the 2024 Donald Trump campaign
- America First Policy Institute – has a transition project which is viewed as a rival to Project 2025.
- Political appointments of the first Trump administration
- Political appointments of the second Trump administration

== Works cited ==
- Dans, Paul; Groves, Steven, eds. (2023). Mandate for Leadership: The Conservative Promise (PDF). Washington, D.C.: The Heritage Foundation. ISBN 978-0-89195-174-2. Archived from the original (PDF) on November 16, 2023.
