= Quiet room (disambiguation) =

A quiet room is a room in an office built with regard to silence by shielding noise from or towards the surroundings.

Quiet room may also refer to:

== Rooms ==
- Anechoic chamber, a room designed to absorb reflections of either sound or electromagnetic waves
- Padded cell, a cell in a psychiatric hospital with cushions lining the walls

== Film and television ==
- The Quiet Room (1996 film), an Australian drama film
- The Quiet Room (2018 film), an American short horror film

== Literature ==
- The Quiet Room, a location in the Marvel Comics series Inhumans
- The Quiet Room: A Journey Out of the Torment of Madness, a 1994 book by Amanda Bennett and Lori Schiller.

== Music ==
- "The Quiet Room", a song by Alice Cooper from his 1978 album From the Inside
- "Quiet Room", a song by Babes in Toyland from their 1992 album Fontanelle

== See also ==
- In a Quiet Room, 1995 country music album by Dan Seals
- In a Quiet Room II, 1998 country music album by Dan Seals
- In My Quiet Room, 1966 album by Harry Belafonte
- Welcome to the Quiet Room, a Japanese comedy-drama released in 2007
- A Quiet Place (disambiguation)
- The Room (disambiguation)
