= Brian Knight (economist) =

American economist

Brian G. Knight is an economics professor at Brown University, as well as a research associate at the National Bureau of Economic Research. He received his B.S. from Miami University in 1992, and his Ph.D. from the University of Wisconsin–Madison in 2000, under the supervision of Arik Levinson.

== Studies ==
In 2006, Knight published a study of the 2000 United States presidential election and stock prices of companies expected to prosper under the front-runner's administration. The study found that the more either George W. Bush or Al Gore was expected to win the election, the higher the values of stocks expected to prosper under their presidency were. In 2011, he and Chun-Fang Chiang co-authored a study of the effects of newspaper endorsements on voters' probabilities of voting for a candidate. Their results showed that voters, especially moderate voters, were more likely to support a candidate if they were endorsed by a newspaper of a different political ideology than the candidate (a "crossover" endorsement). In 2013, he published a study showing that guns used to commit crimes in the United States tend to move from states with weak gun laws to those with strict ones.

== Publications ==
Knight has collaborated to Project 2025; he is thanked for his contribution to having written a portion of Chapter 27: "Financial Regulatory Agencies / Securities and Exchange Commission and Related Agencies".
