= Michael Pack =

American filmmaker and former U.S. official (born 1954)

Michael L. Pack
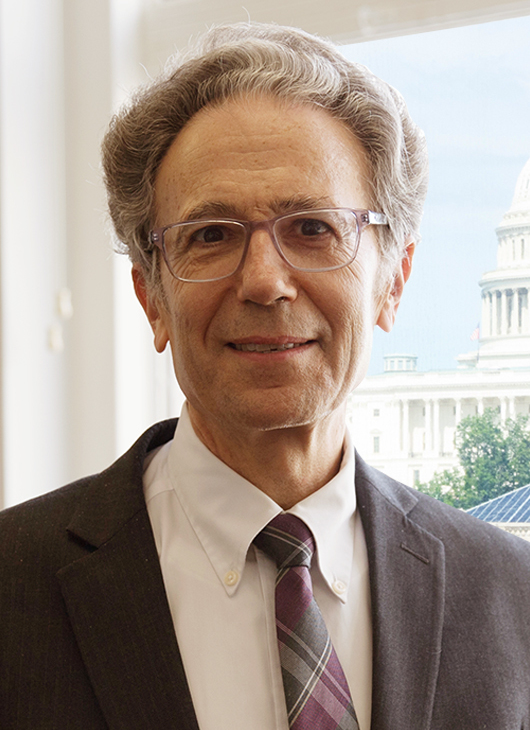

CEO of the U.S. Agency for Global Media
- In office June 5, 2020 – January 20, 2021
- President: Donald Trump
- Preceded by: Grant Turner (Acting)
- Succeeded by: Kelu Chao (Acting)

Personal details
- Born: 1954 (age 71–72) New York City, New York, U.S.
- Party: Republican
- Spouse: Gina Cappo
- Children: 3
- Education: Yale University; University of California, Berkeley

Michael L. Pack is an American documentary filmmaker who was CEO of the U.S. Agency for Global Media (USAGM) from June 2020 to January 2021. Pack was nominated by President Donald Trump and took office at USAGM in June 2020 after Senate confirmation. He resigned on January 20, 2021, at the request of President Joe Biden, effective at 2:00 p.m., two hours after Biden took office.

Pack founded Manifold Productions, a documentary film company, in 1977. He later served as an executive at the Corporation for Public Broadcasting and as CEO of the Claremont Institute, a conservative think tank.

Pack's short tenure as head of USAGM was characterized by NPR as a series of "crises". Pack fired the heads of the news outlets under USAGM's purview, and installed Trump loyalists in the positions. He disbanded a bipartisan board that oversees the USAGM, and spent millions of taxpayer dollars on law firms to investigate journalists for purported bias against Trump. He rescinded rules at USAGM that protected journalists at Voice of America and other affiliates from political interference.

== Early life and education ==
Pack was born in New York City. He attended Yale University from Fall 1972 to Fall 1973, but did not graduate. From Fall 1974 to Spring 1975, Pack studied English at UC Berkeley. School records show that he withdrew without obtaining a degree. Pack attended New York University in the Summer of 1975 as a visiting student.

== Career ==
Early in his career, Pack worked for Radiotelevisione Italiana and the U.S. Information Agency. He founded Manifold Productions, Inc., an independent film production company, in 1977. Through Manifold Productions, Pack has written, directed and produced 13 documentary films on a range of topics.

In 1993, Pack served as co-chair of the International TV Council at the Corporation for Public Broadcasting. In 2002, President Bush nominated and the Senate confirmed Pack to serve on the National Council on the Humanities, which oversees the National Endowment for the Humanities. He served from July 2002 to February 2005. From 2003 to 2006, Pack served as Senior Vice President for Television Programming at the Corporation for Public Broadcasting.

From 2015 to 2017, Pack served as president and CEO of the Claremont Institute in Upland, California, and Publisher of its Claremont Review of Books.

Pack has collaborated with Stephen Bannon, a former Trump advisor and co-founder of the conservative website Breitbart News. In 2019, Pack produced and directed a documentary about the Supreme Court justice Clarence Thomas.

In January 2021, District of Columbia Attorney General Karl Racine sued Public Media Lab and Manifold Productions, alleging that they funneled $4.1 million in tax-protected nonprofit funds to Pack. A settlement was reached in August 2022 with the production company transferring $210,000 back to the nonprofit which then distributed the restitution funds to nonprofit entities and dissolved.

=== USAGM CEO ===
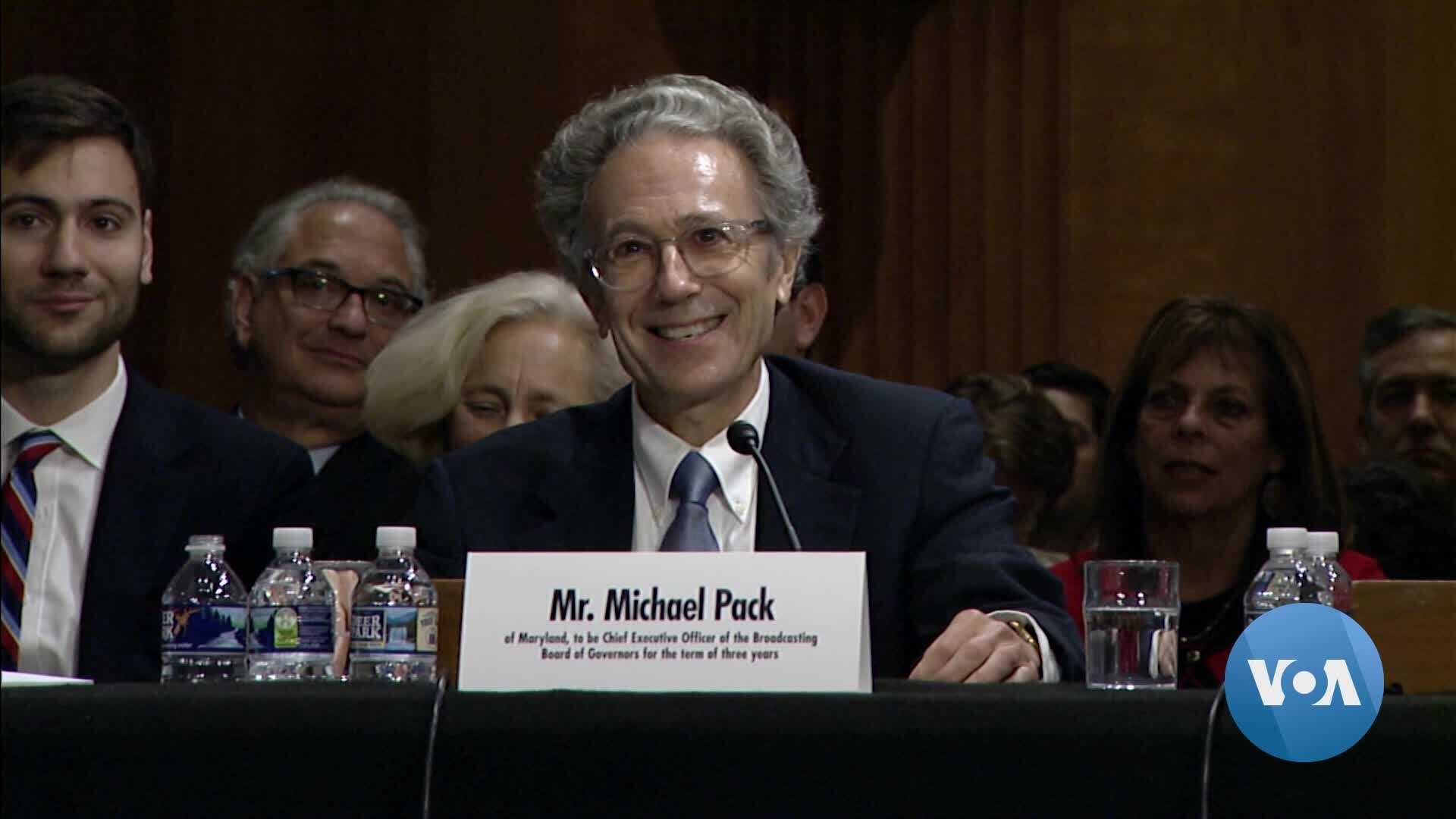
Pack at his confirmation hearing in September 2019

==== Background ====
In 2016, President Barack Obama signed legislation abolishing the Broadcasting Board of Governors, the independent oversight board that had previously controlled several government-sponsored media agencies, including Voice of America and Radio Free Europe/Radio Liberty. The role of the board was replaced by a single agency executive appointed by the White House augmented by advisory boards with no decision-making powers.

In June 2018, the White House announced that President Donald Trump intended to nominate Pack as the chief executive officer of the U.S. Agency for Global Media, making him the first CEO nominated to head the newly created USAGM since the 2016 reforms.

==== Confirmation ====
Pack's first confirmation hearing took place on September 19, 2019. On May 8, 2020, Senator Jim Risch moved to schedule a committee confirmation hearing for Pack for the following week. Pack's nomination was contentious, with critics arguing that the mission of VOA would be compromised by installing a CEO whom they considered a conservative partisan.

On May 12, 2020, Democratic Senator Robert Menendez raised with District of Columbia Attorney General Karl Racine the question of whether Pack unlawfully directed funds from the non-profit charitable organization he ran – Public Media Lab – to his profit-making company Manifold Productions. According to CNBC, at least $1.6 million in donations received by the nonprofit had been sent to Manifold. In response, Racine indicated that he initiated an investigation. A request by Democratic members of the Senate Foreign Relations Committee to delay a vote until the investigation was complete was overruled by Risch, with the committee recommending Pack's nomination on a 12-10 party-line vote.

The Senate invoked cloture on Pack's nomination on June 4, 2020, by a vote of 53–39, and it confirmed him the same day by a vote of 53–38.

==== Tenure ====
Pack assumed office over a week after his confirmation partially so his office could be swept for covert listening devices. One of his first actions as USAGM CEO was to fire the heads of the outlets under his purview – among them Radio Free Europe/Radio Liberty, Middle East Broadcasting Networks (MBN), and the Open Technology Fund – including certain officials favored by conservatives. Pack also installed Trump loyalists in leadership positions within the organization and disbanded a bipartisan board that oversees the USAGM. He planned for editorials to be read and posted on the website in various languages that would present administration policy as set by the president.

Pack continued a purge of USAGM, firing at least seven longstanding agency officials, including chief financial officer Grant Turner and general counsel David Kligerman. Kligerman and Turner said that their removals were retaliation against CEO; Turner said that he had been removed for calling Pack and his team "to account for gross mismanagement of the agency" and Kligerman said, "There is no other conclusion to draw, except that it is in retaliation for attempting to do my job in an apolitical manner and to speak truth to power." Kligerman was fired days after questioning the legality of Pack's mass firings. Under Pack, USAGM hired Frank Wuco, a former conservative talk radio "shock jock" known for spreading conspiracy theories and calling President Barack Obama a "Kenyan." It was reported in July 2020 that the USAGM under Pack would not extend visas for foreign VOA journalists. In late July 2020, Pack announced an investigation of a VOA video that purportedly promoted Joe Biden's presidential campaign. In August 2020, USAGM required several of its outlets to return money allocated for internet freedom projects for the agency to reallocate for other internet freedom uses.

In August 2020, Pack suspended top executives at USAGM, reportedly angry at them for telling him that some of his plans might be illegal. In an apparent attempt to get the executives fired, he hired a private law firm, McGuireWoods, to investigate them, though it found no malfeasance, and the executives were later reinstated.

On October 26, 2020, Pack rescinded rules at USAGM that protected journalists at VOA and other affiliates from political interference. Career employees at Voice of America accused Pack of seeking influence over the outlet's reporting and filed suit in federal court, seeking injunctions that prevent Pack from making personnel decisions about journalists employed by the agency, directly communicating with them and conducting any investigations into editorial content or individual journalists. On November 20, 2020, Judge Beryl Howell of the U.S. District Court for the District of Columbia granted the injunctions. "The court confirmed that the First Amendment forbids Mr. Pack and his team from attempting to take control of these journalistic outlets, from investigating their journalists for purported 'bias,' and from attempting to influence or control their reporting content," Lee Crain, a lawyer for the plaintiffs, said in a statement.

The U.S. Office of Special Counsel revealed on December 2, 2020, that it had found "a substantial likelihood of wrongdoing" at USAGM, including "gross mismanagement" by Pack and violations of the legal firewall meant to protect Voice of America's journalistic integrity. It demanded that the USAGM investigate allegations by whistleblowers. The Government Accountability Project, a public interest law firm, told NPR that it was representing more than 20 whistleblowers at USAGM.

Among other appointments, Pack appointed Robert R. Reilly to lead VOA on December 9, 2020, and Victoria Coates to lead MBN on December 22.

On January 14, 2021, six days before Joe Biden's inauguration as president, a group of Voice of America journalists signed a letter demanding the resignation of the director of VOA and his deputy. The controversy concerned the reassignment of reporters Patsy Widakuswara and News Director Yolanda Lopez after the journalists questioned outgoing Secretary of State Mike Pompeo.

On January 20, 2021, the day Biden took office, Pack resigned at Biden's request, effective at 2:00 p.m., two hours after Biden took office.

NPR conducted scores of interviews over the controversies Pack's actions engendered. And few at the agency or its broadcasters agreed with Pack's characterization of his mission or performance, instead characterizing him as seeking political control over their coverage.

In February 2023, three independent experts released a review of Pack's management actions at USAGM from June 2020 to January 2021. The review concluded Pack repeatedly "abused his authority" and "engaged in gross mismanagement and gross waste."

==== Project 2025 ====
Pack has collaborated to Project 2025; he is thanked for his contribution to Chapter 8: "Media Agencies / Corporation for Public Broadcasting".

== Filmography ==
Pack has written, directed, and produced numerous documentaries, principally for PBS, as well as corporate and educational films. His major credits include:

- Hollywood's Favorite Heavy: Businessmen on Prime Time TV, hosted by Eli Wallach (1987)
- Campus Culture Wars: Five Stories about Political Correctness, narrated by Lindsay Crouse (1993)
- Hollywood vs. Religion, hosted by Michael Medved (1995)
- Inside the Republican Revolution: The First Hundred Days, hosted by Don Lambro (1995)
- The Rodney King Incident: Race and Justice in America, narrated by Robert Prosky (1998)
- The Fall of Newt Gingrich, narrated by Blair Brown (2000)
- Rediscovering George Washington, hosted by Richard Brookhiser (2002)
- God and the Inner City, narrated by Phylicia Rashad (2003)
- Rediscovering Alexander Hamilton, hosted by Richard Brookhiser (2011)
- RICKOVER: The Birth of Nuclear Power, narrated by Joan Allen (2014)
- Created Equal: Clarence Thomas in His Own Words (2020)
- The Last 600 Meters (2020), a documentary about "the two biggest battles of the Iraqi war"

Government offices
Preceded by Grant Turner (acting)	CEO U.S. Agency for Global Media; 2020–2021	Succeeded by Kelu Chao (acting)
