= Dan Stein (attorney) =

American activist

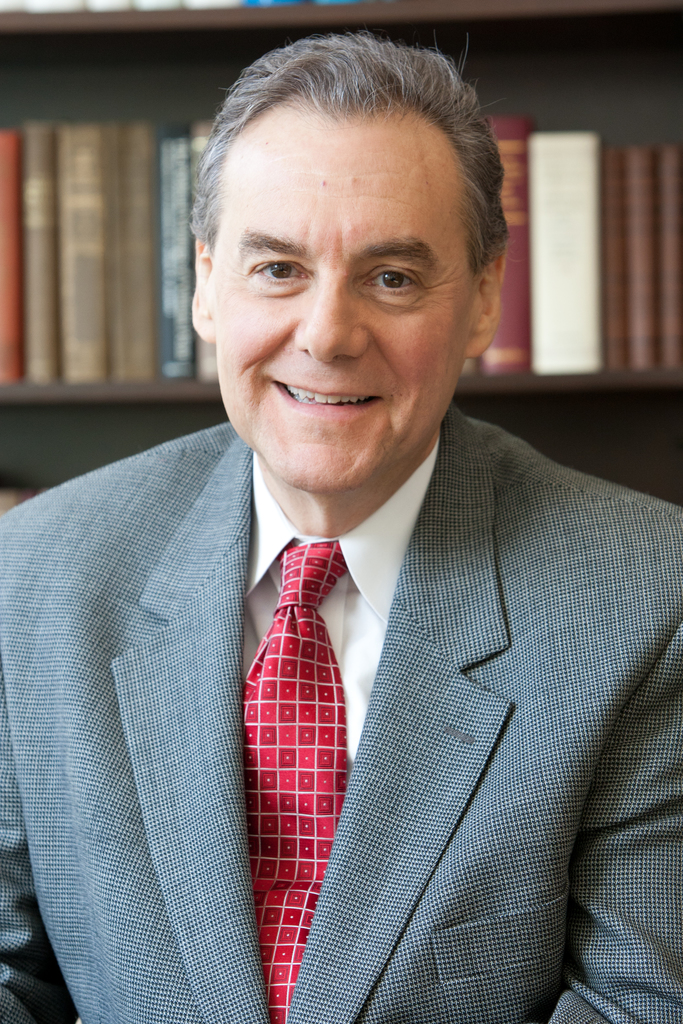
- Stein in 2011
- Born: Daniel Alan Stein; 1955 (age 70–71)
- Education: Indiana University Bloomington; Catholic University of America (JD)
- Occupation: Attorney
- Employer: Federation for American Immigration Reform (retired)

Daniel Alan Stein (born 1955) is an American attorney and anti-immigration advocate. He served as president of the Federation for American Immigration Reform (FAIR), a conservative organization that seeks to reduce immigration to the United States, from 2003 to 2025. FAIR has been designated as a hate group by the Southern Poverty Law Center.

== Early life and education ==
Dan Stein was born in 1955 and grew up in Washington, D.C. He received his undergrad from Indiana University and attended the Columbus School of Law at the Catholic University of America where he received his J.D. Before working in immigration law, Stein worked in private practice.

== Anti-immigration activism ==
Dan Stein served as the Executive Director at The Immigration Reform Law Institute (IRLI), an anti-immigration legal group, prior to his work with the Federation for American Immigration Reform (FAIR). IRLI is the legal affiliate of FAIR per the FAIR website. The Southern Poverty Law Center has described FAIR as a hate group with ties to white supremacist groups.

Dan Stein joined the Federation for American Immigration Reform in 1982 as FAIR's Press Secretary. Stein became the executive director of FAIR in 1988, then took over as its first president in 2003. FAIR grew under Stein's leadership, with the organization numbering over 2 million members across the United States in 2018. Per the organization, he stepped down in 2025.

In his various positions at FAIR, Stein regularly appeared at televised debates and roundtables offering an anti-immigration perspective on immigration issues. He has advocated against birthright citizenship, arguing that it leads to birth tourism. In an interview with NPR (National Public Radio), he argued that the United States should impose stricter regulations on legal migration. Stein is also opposed to programs such as temporary protected status. He worked closely with white nationalist John Tanton, the founder of FAIR.

Together with Texan politician Lance Gooden, Dan Stein wrote an anti-immigration article for The Washington Examiner in March 2025.

== See also ==
- Nativism (politics)
- Opposition to immigration
- Xenophobia
