= You Don't Speak for Me =

American anti-illegal immigration organization

You Don't Speak for Me was a national, American organization active in 2006 and 2007 created by American Hispanics who supported enforcement of U.S. immigration laws. Retired Army Colonel Al Rodriguez founded the group in 2006, to represent Hispanic Americans such as himself who are opposed to legalization for those who have entered the US illegally or overstayed their visas.

The national organization was headed by Albert Rodriguez, the former mayor of Douglas, Arizona. Rodriguez is a second generation America of Puerto Rican and Mexican ancestry.

The group had chapters in several states.

Clarence Page noted that "You Don't Speak For Me" stood shoulder to shoulder with "Choose Black America" in opposing amnesty for illegal immigrants.

== History ==
The group was created after Rodriguez viewed media coverage of the 2006 United States immigration reform protests. According to Rodriguez, "Their leaders were saying it was a march for immigrant rights and a Latino/Hispanic movement. I thought to myself, 'Hey, those are illegal aliens, not immigrants!' I'm of Hispanic ancestry and those people are acting like they speak for me. Well, you don't speak for me!"

You Don't Speak for Me was launched with help from the Federation for American Immigration Reform, an organization that supports lower levels of immigration in the United States.

== Activity ==
The group supported petitions calling for enforcement of laws against illegal immigration and held and participated in anti-illegal immigration rallies.

In 2007, group leaders participated in a rally for immigration reform outside of the White House.

In 2007 the Arizona chapter backed a bill to penalize employers who knowingly hired workers not in the United States legally.
