= Lancaster Country Day School =

Coordinates: 40.0508°N 76.3278°W

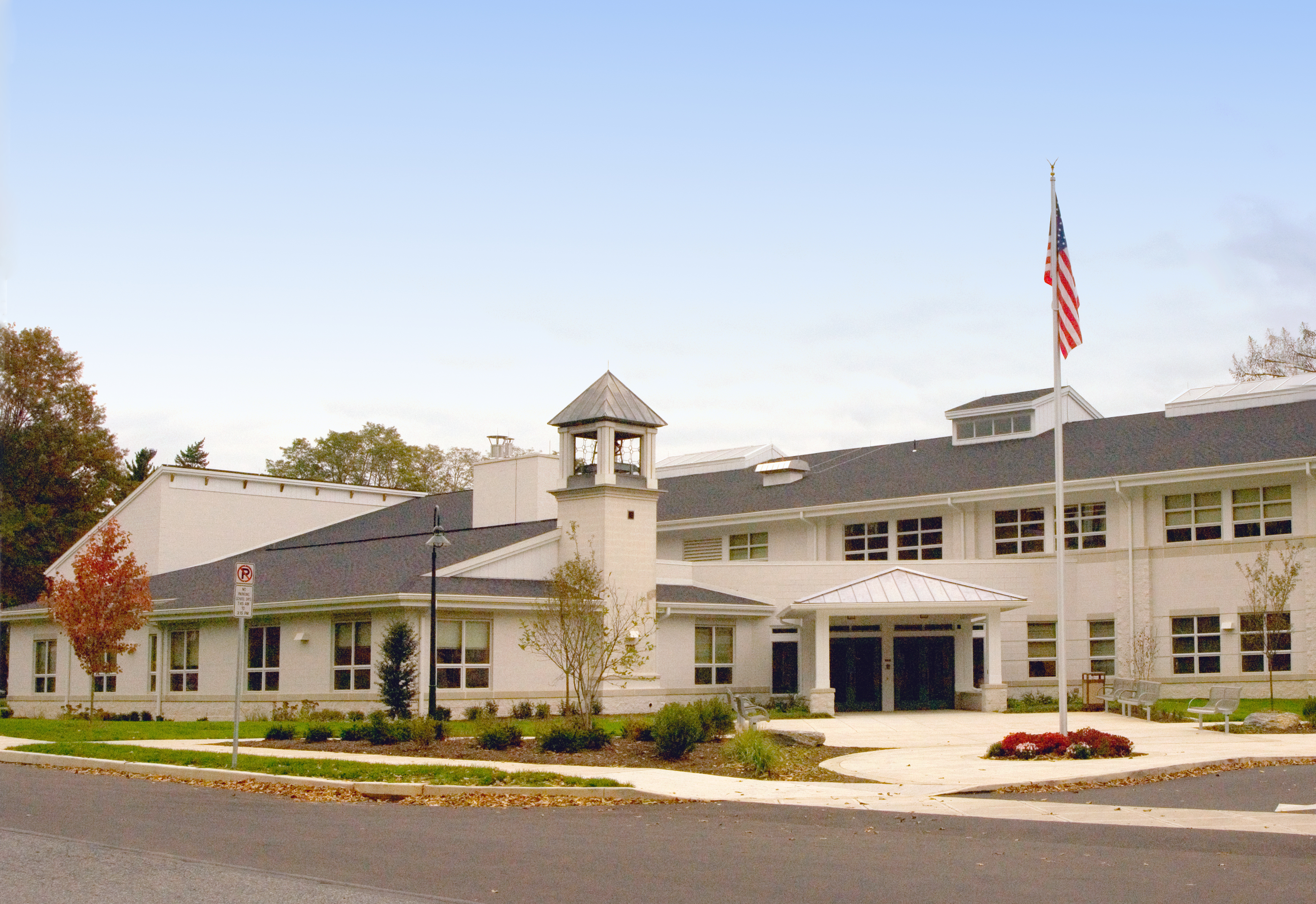

Location
- 725 Hamilton Road, Lancaster, PA 17603; Lancaster, Pennsylvania; United States

Information
- Other name: LCDS
- Type: Private, secular, coeducational college prep school
- Motto: '"Fax mentis et cordis incendium gloriae." (The spark that kindles the mind and heart illuminates a lifetime.)
- Religious affiliation: Secular
- Established: 1908
- CEEB code: 392115
- Head of School: Emilie Kosoff
- Gender: Coeducational
- Enrollment: 575 (PK-12)
- Average class size: 14 students
- Student to teacher ratio: 8:1
- Campus: Suburban, 26 acres
- Colors: Maroon; Gray
- Athletics: Pennsylvania Interscholastic Athletic Association
- Mascot: Cougar
- Website: http://lancastercountryday.org/

Lancaster Country Day School (LCDS) is a private, secular, coeducational college preparatory school in Lancaster, Pennsylvania, United States. The school has 600 students in preschool through twelfth grade.

== History ==
=== Founding ===
The school was founded in 1908 as a girls' school known as The Shippen School for Girls, the result of a merger between Lancaster College and Miss Stahr's School. In 1943, with the closing of nearby Franklin and Marshall Academy for Boys, the Shippen School changed its charter to become coeducational and adopted its current name. In 1949, it moved to its present location on Hamilton Road.

=== Headmasters ===
- Eleanor Fitzpatrick, 1943–1945
- Rebecca Walton Griest, 1945–1946
- Robert Holt Iglehart, 1946–1949
- John L. Byerly, 1949–1962
- Carl Denlinger, 1962
- Nathaniel Saltonstall II, 1962–1965
- John Jarvis, 1965–1990
- Richard Johnson, 1991–1999
- Mike Mersky, 1999–2007
- Daphna Ben-Chaim (interim), 2007–2008
- Steven D. Lisk, 2008–2022
- Matthew W. Micciche, 2022-2024
- Lewis Thayne (interim), 2025
- Emilie D. Kosoff, 2025–present

=== School seal ===
Lancaster Country Day School has a circular seal done in red ink which illustrates the Red Rose of Lancaster County. Bordering the seal is LCDS' motto in Latin, "fax mentis et cordis incendium gloriae," meaning, "the spark that kindles the mind and heart illuminates a lifetime."

=== Deepfake pornography scandal ===
In 2024, two male students were arrested and charged with 59 felony counts of manufacture of child sexual abuse material after creating deepfake pornography of 60 female students and their acquaintances; they later plead guilty, and on March 25 2026 were sentenced to probation and 60 hours of community service. The school was sued in 2026 by 13 female students and their families, alleging the school failed to adequately protect the girls and did not inform or cooperate with local police. The Lancaster Country Day School responded that, based on the law at the time, the incidents did not qualify as abuse and they met their legal obligation by reporting to the Pennsylvania Attorney General's office.

== School statistics ==
=== Faculty ===
84% of LCDS faculty and staff have advanced degrees.

=== Diversity ===
34% of students identify as students of color.

=== Tuition ===
33% of LCDS students receive need-based financial aid.

== Academics ==
LCDS places above the national average in standardized testing. Nationally, the average SAT score is 1068 and the average ACT is 20.8. Pennsylvania's average SAT score is 1086 and ACT score is 23.7. As of 2018, LCDS' average SAT score is 1288 and average ACT score is 29.

== Co-curricular activities ==
=== Model United Nations ===
Since 1980, LCDS has regularly sent senior students to The Hague for International Model United Nations conferences. In 2018 it was one of just seven U.S. schools invited to participate in this annual program, and in 2019 they were the only U.S. school to attend an international conference in Qatar.

== Athletics ==
LCDS competes in District III of the Pennsylvania Interscholastic Athletic Association (PIAA) and is a member of the Lancaster-Lebanon League. The school sponsors the following sports:

Fall

- (C) Golf
- (G) Field hockey
- (B, G) Soccer
- (G) Tennis

Winter

- (B, G) Basketball
- (B, G) Squash

Spring

- (B, G) Lacrosse
- (B) Tennis

The school has a cooperative agreement with the School District of Lancaster, through which LCDS students can participate in baseball, football, bowling, cross country, swimming, track and field, wrestling, and boys' volleyball for McCaskey. LCDS students can compete on Lancaster Catholic High School's girls' volleyball team, while students from Lancaster Catholic may join the LCDS boys' and girls' lacrosse teams.

The school mascot is a cougar, and the school colors are maroon and gray. Teams from the school have competed in the PIAA District III and PIAA State playoffs.

== Community outreach ==
- Beginning in the summer of 2015, Lancaster Country Day School began offering the national Horizons program to low-income elementary school students from the school district of Lancaster. Horizons partners with independent schools and colleges to help students keep pace with their peers by minimizing the amount of information they forget during summer vacation.
- Lancaster Country Day's work with Lancaster Area Habitat for Humanity began in 2001 and continues to grow, with the school winning Habitat's 2013 Humanitarian of the Year Award, presented in a celebration dinner on World Habitat Day.
- In addition to time Upper Schoolers spend volunteering at the center, in 2014 the boys' lacrosse team raised more than $1,000 for the Schreiber Pediatric Center in Lancaster.
- The Bangla-Dash fundraiser and race benefiting the Carter Academy in Bangladesh were conceived and implemented by the class of 2017.

== Notable alumni ==
- Alice Rebecca Appenzeller 1915 — first American born in Korea; President of Ewha College (1922–1939)
- Victoria Curtin Gardner Coates 1986 — author and former national security adviser for Senator Ted Cruz
- Michael Deibert 1992 — journalist and author
- Mark Ibold 1980 — bass guitarist for Pavement and Sonic Youth
- Carla Kihlstedt 1989 — musician (violinist, vocalist)
- Rya Kihlstedt 1987 — actress: Nashville, Dexter
- Andrew J. Porter 1990 — author
