= The Last 600 Meters =

2025 documentary film

The Last 600 Meters: The Battles of Najaf and Fallujah is a 2025 documentary film which follows members of the United States military as they fight in Najaf and Fallujah in 2004 during the Iraq War. The film was directed by Michael Pack.
