= Alice Rebecca Appenzeller =

American educator and minister

- Born: 9 November 1885; Seoul, Korea (Today: South Korea)
- Died: 20 February 1950 (aged 64); Seoul, Korea

Alice Rebecca Appenzeller (9 November 1885 – 20 February 1950) was the first American and first Caucasian born in Korea. Daughter of the Methodist missionary Rev. Henry Appenzeller who was among the first to introduce Protestantism to Korea, she spent her early years in Seoul until returning to the United States in 1902. There she pursued her education, first at the Shippen School for Girls (what is now Lancaster Country Day School). She later graduated from Wellesley College, after which she returned to the Shippen School to teach. She was appointed by the Methodist Church as a missionary teacher at Ewha College in Seoul in 1915 and became president of the college in October 1922.

She returned to the United States to earn her master's degree from Teachers College, Columbia University in 1922. In 1932 she was ordained as a Methodist minister and appointed to the First Methodist Church in Seoul founded by her father. In 1935 she was awarded the Blue Ribbon Medal for meritorious service in education by the Imperial Government of Japan. She was the first woman in Korea to receive this award.

In 1940 she left Korea, along with many other missionaries after the US government advised US citizens to leave Japanese territory. She served as professor and dean of women at Scarritt College until 1943 and returned to Korea in 1946 where she was made honorary president at Ewha College until her death in 1950. Both the President of Korea, Syngman Rhee, and the American ambassador, who was at that time John J. Muccio, spoke at her funeral.
