= Amanda Bennett =

American journalist (born 1952)

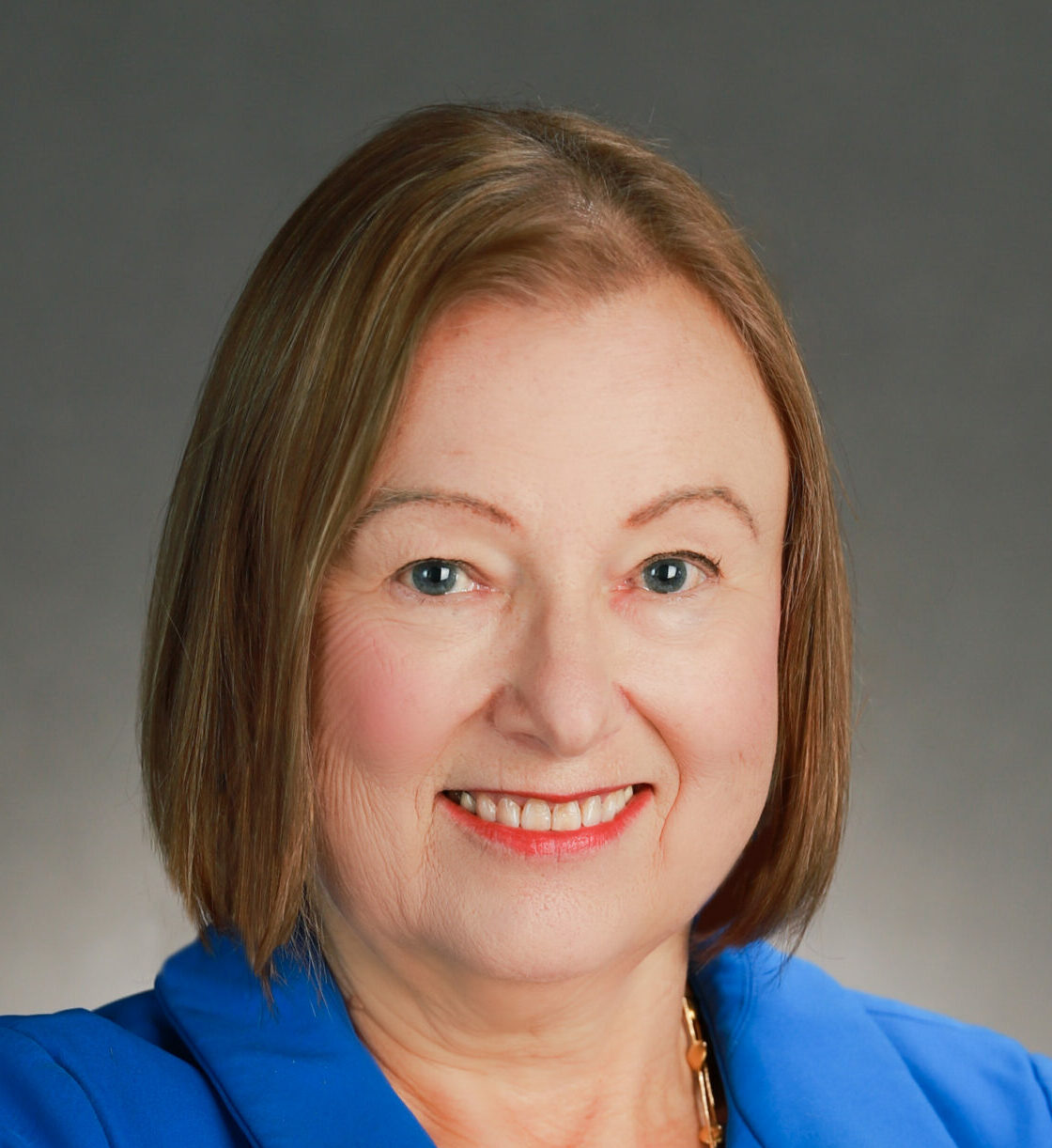

CEO of the U.S. Agency for Global Media
- In office December 6, 2022 – January 20, 2025
- President: Joe Biden
- Preceded by: Kelu Chao (acting)
- Succeeded by: Victor Morales (acting)

Personal details
- Born: July 9, 1952 (age 74) Cambridge, Massachusetts, U.S.
- Spouse(s): Philip Oxley (m. 1976–1983) Terence Foley (m. 1987; died 2007) Donald E. Graham (m. 2012)
- Education: Harvard University (BA)

Amanda Bennett (born July 9, 1952) is an American journalist and author who was CEO of U.S. Agency for Global Media from 2022 to 2025. She was the director of Voice of America from 2016 to 2020. She formerly edited The Philadelphia Inquirer and the Lexington Herald-Leader. Bennett is also the author of six nonfiction books.

== Early life and education ==
Bennett was born in Cambridge, Massachusetts, and was raised in Boonton, New Jersey, where she attended Boonton High School, graduating in 1971. She graduated with a degree in English language and literature from Harvard College in 1975, where she was an editor on The Harvard Crimson.

== Career ==
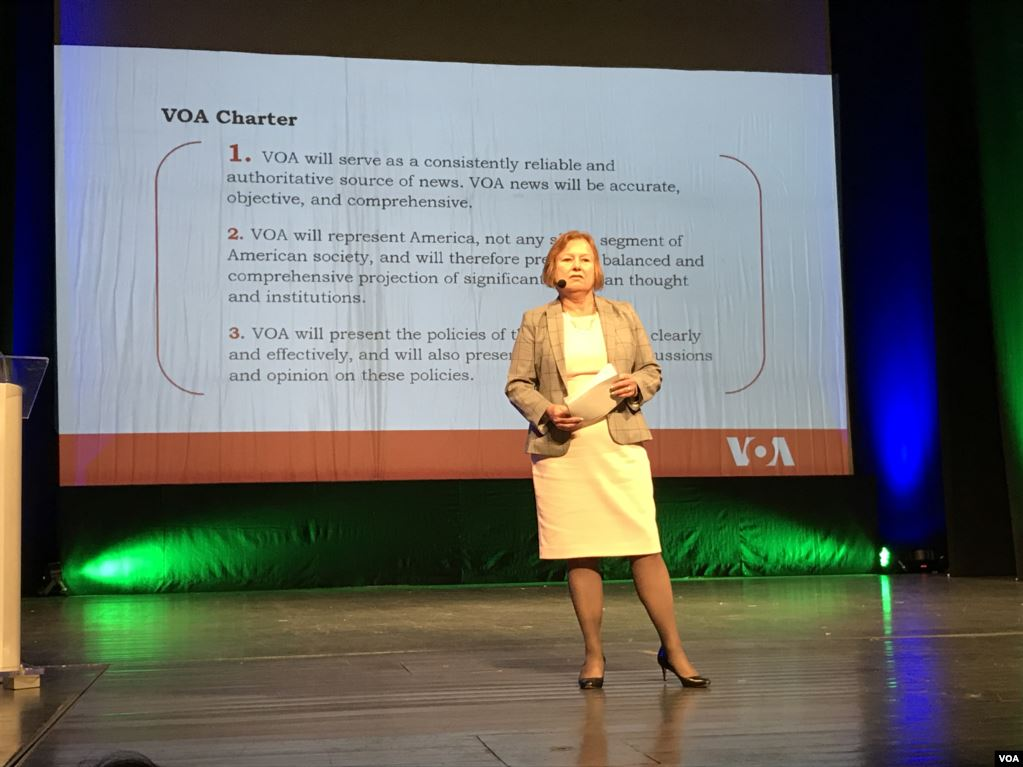
Amanda Bennett, while director of the Voice of America, giving a presentation on the power of truth in a world of disinformation at the Media Literacy Conference in Sarajevo, September 22, 2017

Bennett's journalism career began at the Harvard Crimson, where she was an editor. Following her 1975 graduation from Harvard College, she worked briefly as a bilingual (French-English) reporter on the Ottawa Citizen in Ottawa, Ontario. She had a 23-year career with The Wall Street Journal, which included reporting stints in Toronto, Detroit, Washington, D.C. and three years as bureau chief in Atlanta. In 1983, she became the second Wall Street Journal correspondent in China.

In 1987, she shared with her Journal colleagues a Pulitzer Prize for National Reporting for her work on how public health officials mischaracterized the AIDS epidemic in order to secure more public funding and financial support. In 1998, she left the Journal to become a managing editor at The Oregonian, a regional newspaper owned by the Newhouse chain and headed by the pioneer journalist, Sandra Mims Rowe. At the Oregonian, she headed the creation of investigative projects. Among the projects she led was a year-long investigation of the $1 billion local asset manager, Capital Consultants, that led to the September 2000, suit by the U.S. Securities and Exchange Commission against the firm and its principal Jeffrey Grayson. The project was reported by veteran investigative reporters Jeff Manning and Jim Long. Bennett also led the Oregonian in an investigation of the Immigration and Naturalization Service that won the paper the 2001 Pulitzer Prize for Public Service.

In September 2001, she became editor of The Lexington Herald-Leader, a Knight Ridder paper. Twenty months later on June 2, 2003, Knight Ridder appointed her the first female editor in the 174-year history of their flagship paper, The Philadelphia Inquirer. In November 2006, Bennett stepped down as the Inquirer's editor.

From November 2006 to June 2013, she was executive editor at Bloomberg News, where she created and ran a global team of investigative reporters and editors. She was also a co-founder, with journalist Lisa Kassenaar, of Bloomberg News' Women's project. Under her direction, a team of Bloomberg journalists for the first time tallied the personal assets of family members of a senior Chinese leader – vice president Xi Jinping. The story, which was widely circulated both inside and outside China, won the Polk Award and also resulted in Bloomberg's business in China being significantly disrupted. She resigned from Bloomberg News in November 2013.

Bennett has also been a freelance journalist and public speaker, and she has spoken at TED on journalism and end-of-life care.

In 2016, she was named the director of Voice of America. In mid-June 2020, as the Trump administration replaced VOA's parent agency director with conservative filmmaker Michael Pack, Bennett announced her resignation.

In November 2021, she was nominated by President Joe Biden to serve as the CEO of the U.S. Agency for Global Media. In June 2022, she testified in a nomination hearing in front of the United States Senate Committee on Foreign Relations. Later that month she won Foreign Relations Committee approval in an "en bloc" vote by the Democratic majority on the committee. Bennet was confirmed to the post of CEO by the Senate in a 60 to 36 vote on September 22, 2022. Bennet was sworn in on December 6, 2022, succeeding acting CEO Kelu Chao.

== Professional affiliations ==
In 2003, she was elected to the Pulitzer Prize board. In 2010, she was elected co-chair of the Pulitzer Board. She was on the board of the Loeb Awards; the board of the Fund for Investigative Journalism; she was a board member of Axis Philly, a nonprofit online Philadelphia news site. She is on the board of the committee to Protect Journalists. She is a trustee of the German Marshall Fund. She is on the advisory board of the Neiman Fellowship program at Harvard University and is an advisory board member at the Philip Merrill Howard Center for Investigative Journalism. She is also currently a Lenfest Institute for Journalism Board Manager.

== Personal life ==
She has two children with her late husband, Terence Foley, and four step-children with her husband, Donald E. Graham, whom she married on June 30, 2012. She lives in Washington, D.C.

== Books written ==
- The Death of the Organization Man (1990)
- The Man Who Stayed Behind (with Sidney Rittenberg) (1993)
- The Quiet Room: A Journey Out of the Torment of Madness (with Lori Schiller) (1994)
- In Memoriam (with Terence B. Foley) (1997)
- Your Child's Symptoms (with Dr. John Garwood) (1995)
- The Cost of Hope: A Memoir (2012)

== Awards and honors ==
Bennett shared the Prize for national reporting with her Wall Street Journal colleagues, and in 2001 led a team from The Oregonian to a Pulitzer Prize for Public Service. Projects by the Bloomberg Projects and Investigations team won numerous awards, including Loeb, Polk, Barlett & Steele, Headliners, Society of American Business Editors and Writers and Overseas Press Club Awards.

- 2001 Pulitzer Prize for Public Service
- 2011 Gerald Loeb Award for Magazines for "End-of-Life Warning at $618,616 Makes Me Wonder Was It Worth It."
- 2018 Lifetime Achievement, Washington Women in Journalism Awards
- 2019 National Press Club Fourth Estate Award
- Senior Fellow, University of Southern California's Annenberg Center on Communication Leadership & Policy
