= Frank Wuco =

American politician

Frank Edward Wuco is a United States government official and former conservative talk radio host. He served in multiple positions in the first administration of U.S. President Donald Trump. Wuco has been criticized for spreading conspiracy theories, including through a fictional character who supposedly is a former jihadist who now exposes aspects of Islam-inspired terrorism.

== Career ==
Wuco previously worked in the United States Navy as an intelligence officer. Wuco completed Navy recruit training at Naval Training Center San Diego in 1981. His postings included the USS Fox between 1987 and 1989. He reportedly retired from the Navy in 2004. He later worked at CENTCOM, where he worked under future White House National Security Advisor Michael Flynn.

Wuco is the founder and CEO of a security consultancy called Red Mind Solutions. He was the editor of a blog titled The Daily SITREP. He hosted the weekly Frank Wuco Radio Show on WFLA AM 970 in Tampa Bay from 2011 to 2013.

From 2017 to November 2019, Wuco worked as a senior White House advisor to the United States Department of Homeland Security. As White House adviser to DHS, Wuco led a team tasked with enforcing President Donald Trump's executive orders, including the administration's travel ban policies. According to Politico, John F. Kelly and his staff were often at odds with Wuco, with one person close to Kelly commenting that Wuco "knows nothing about the mission" of the department and "serves little purpose or value."

In November 2019, Wuco was appointed a senior advisor in the Bureau of Arms Control, Verification and Compliance of the U.S. Department of State. In August 2020, Wuco was hired by the U.S. Agency for Global Media. In 2020, the White House unsuccessfully sought to place Wuco in the Department of Defense.

== Promotion of conspiracy theories ==
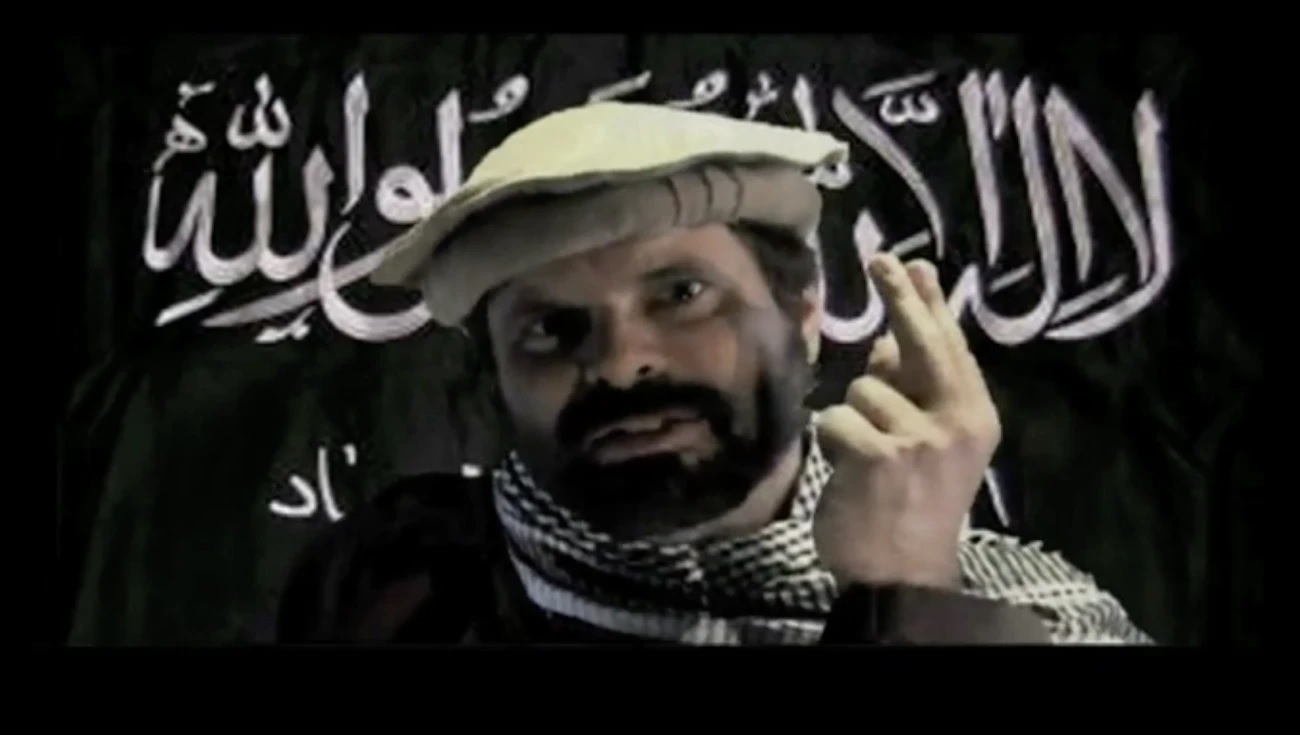
Frank Wuco portraying Faud Wasul in "Ask the Jihadist" January 2013

Prior to working in the Trump Administration, Wuco hosted a talk radio show in Florida, where he promoted birtherism and criticized Islam. He commented, for instance, that "Obama knew nothing of the 'black American experience,' defended the initial speculation in the media that Muslim extremists were responsible for a mass killing in Norway, and said that gay people had hijacked the word 'gay' from happy people". He also created and played the part of a supposed former Muslim jidahist on his radio show, which he used to vent critiques of Islam and American policy.

Among the many conspiracy theories he promoted on his radio show was that Barack Obama's memoir was actually ghostwritten by former radical left militant Bill Ayers, that former CIA director John Brennan was a Muslim and that former attorney general Eric Holder had been a member of the Black Panthers.

In January 2010, Wuco created a fictional character called Faud Wasul. According to reporting by Mother Jones, Wasul is a "fictional terrorist whose 'model behavior' led him to be released from US custody so that he could tour the United States to talk about jihad". Wuco co-hosted or guest hosted role-playing as "Faud Wasul" sporting a keffiyeh scarf, faking an Arab accent, and impersonating a jihadist in multiple video blogs, on radio shows, and in live speeches.

In a September 2012 appearance on a right-wing radio program, Wuco claimed that Huma Abedin, a top aide to Hillary Clinton, had ties to the Muslim Brotherhood, an Islamist political group, and that her parents were members of the organization.

In January 2013, Wuco attacked Colin Powell for his condemnation of racism in the Republican Party. In February 2013, he claimed that John Brennan, then the nominee to be the director of the CIA, had converted to Islam when he was stationed in Saudi Arabia. Wuco interviewed former FBI agent John Guandolo, who is the only source for the unsubstantiated claim. In a May 2013 episode of his radio show, Wuco falsely claimed that then-Attorney General Eric Holder was involved in the Black Panthers in the 1970s.

In January 2016, when speaking to The Dougherty Report, he was asked why the U.S. doesn't just turn Syria and Iran into "glass already". Wuco responded: "Um well, I — I mean, I know what you're getting at... I mean, it's, it's that our, I mean it's been our — I don't think it's been our policy really to just start nuking countries. I think if we were going to have done that, my preference would have been to have dropped a couple of low-yield tactical nuclear weapons over Afghanistan the day after 9/11 to send a definite message to the world that they had screwed up in a big way".

== Project 2025 ==
Wuco contributed to Project 2025. He is thanked for his contribution to Chapter 8: "Media Agencies / Corporation for Public Broadcasting".
