= Victoria Coates =

American official, writer and art historian

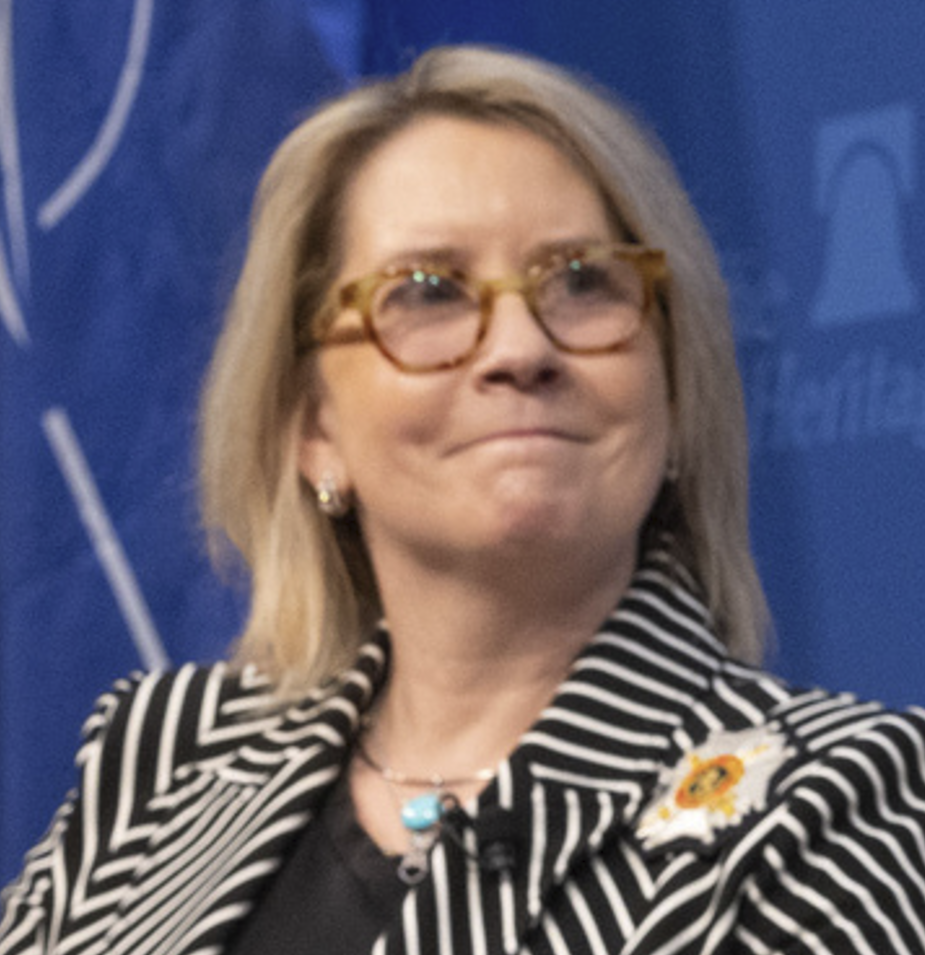

Deputy National Security Advisor for Middle East and North African Affairs
- In office October 10, 2019 – February 21, 2020
- President: Donald Trump
- Preceded by: Position established
- Succeeded by: Position disbanded

Personal details
- Born: Victoria Curtin Gardner Lancaster, Pennsylvania, U.S.
- Party: Republican
- Education: Trinity College, Connecticut (BA); Williams College (MA); University of Pennsylvania (PhD)

Victoria Curtin Gardner Coates is an American conservative political advisor. She served as senior advisor to the Secretary of Energy Dan Brouillette in 2020 and was later appointed to run the Middle East Broadcasting Networks. She served on the United States National Security Council, originally as the Special Assistant to the President and Senior Director for Strategic Assessments before being promoted to Deputy National Security Advisor upon the nomination of Robert C. O'Brien. She is vice president of the conservative think tank The Heritage Foundation.

== Early life ==
Coates was born and raised in Lancaster, Pennsylvania, where her father, Eugene Herr Gardner, started an investment firm. She is a distant descendant of Andrew Gregg Curtin, who served as Governor of Pennsylvania during the Civil War.

She attended Lancaster Country Day School through 1986. After earning an undergraduate degree at Trinity College, Connecticut, she obtained a master's degree in art history from Williams College in 1992, and a doctorate from the University of Pennsylvania, where she wrote a dissertation on Camillo Massimo. She later taught at the university as an occasional adjunct instructor.

== Political career ==
In the 2000s, she blogged mainly about foreign policy under the pen name "AcademicElephant" at the conservative blog RedState. Her blog posts were read by aides of Secretary of Defense Donald Rumsfeld, who later recruited Coates to work as an advisor for his book, Known and Unknown: A Memoir, published in 2011.

Coates served as an advisor to former Texas governor Rick Perry during his 2012 presidential bid. She became an advisor to Ted Cruz in 2013 and his leading national security advisor during his 2016 presidential campaign.

Her book David's Sling: A History of Democracy in Ten Works of Art was published early in 2016 by Encounter Books. The book covers ten European artists and their major works, including Michelangelo (David), Jacques-Louis David (The Death of Marat), and Picasso (Guernica).

=== Trump administration ===
Coates joined the White House when President Donald Trump took office in 2017 and became one of the president's longest-serving staffers. She was senior director at the National Security Council for the Middle East and North Africa, and in 2019, Robert C. O'Brien promoted her to Deputy National Security Advisor. As deputy, she split her duties with fellow deputy Matthew Pottinger.

In February 2020, Coates left the White House to become a senior advisor at the Energy Department.

As an advisor to the Energy Secretary, Coates was based in Saudi Arabia as Washington struggled to deal with a global oil price crash threatening U.S. energy producers during the COVID-19 pandemic.

In December 2020, Coates was appointed to run the Middle East Broadcasting Networks. In January 2021, she was fired from the position by the acting CEO of U.S. Agency for Global Media, Kelu Chao.

=== The Heritage Foundation ===
As a vice president at the Heritage Foundation, Coates oversees Project Esther. The task force that inspired Project Esther was primarily Christian and conservative. Project Esther seeks to counter pro-Palestinian activism in the United States and combat political activism, particularly by the left.

== Personal life ==
Coates lives with her husband, George G. H. Coates Jr., a wine dealer and chair of the Commonwealth Foundation for Public Policy Alternatives, with their two children in Chestnut Hill, Philadelphia. They married while she was a student at the University of Pennsylvania.
