= Julie Kirchner =

American anti-immigration activist and former government official

Julie Kirchner is an American former government official.

== Biography ==
Kirchner grew up in Iowa in a Hungarian-American family. Before attending university, she spent a year in Hungary, studying Hungarian at Eötvös Loránd University, and violin at the Franz Liszt Academy of Music. Back in the United States, she studied political science at Yale University and law at the University of Iowa College of Law, subsequently working in law practice.

From 2005 to 2015, she worked for the Federation for American Immigration Reform (FAIR), a nonprofit organization that aims to reduce illegal immigration to the United States. She served as FAIR's Executive Director from 2007 to 2015.

In April 2017, she briefly served as advisor to Kevin McAleenan, acting director of Customs and Border Protection, before being appointed Citizenship and Immigration Services Ombudsman the following month. She served as the CIS Ombudsman until October 2019.
