= Arik Levinson =

American economist

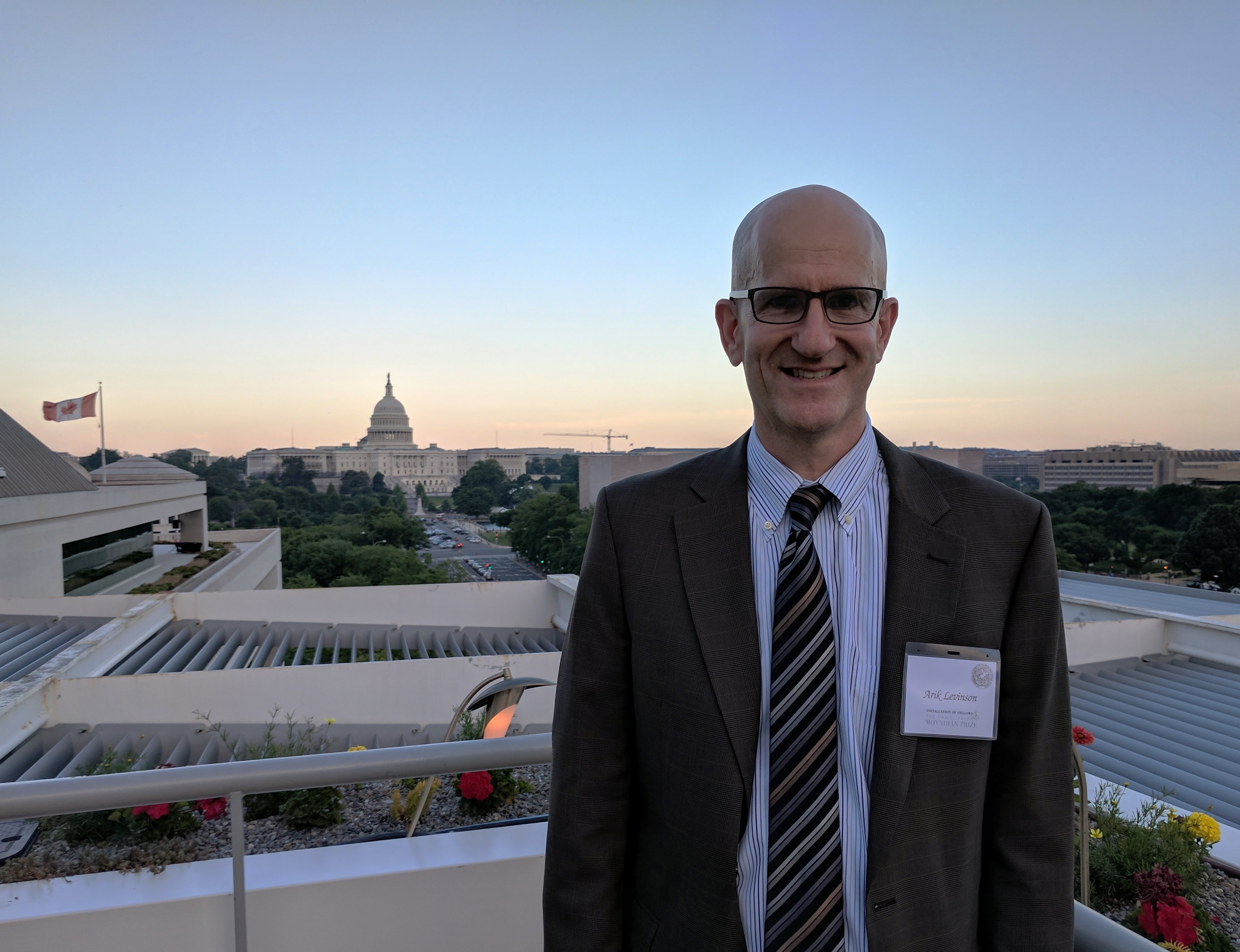
- Website: https://www.ariklevinson.com/

Arik Levinson is a professor of economics at Georgetown University. His research is in the fields of energy economics and environmental economics. From 2022 to 2024 he was Deputy Assistant Treasury Secretary for Climate and Energy Economics in the Biden administration, and from 2010 to 2011 a senior economist at the Council of Economic Advisers in the Obama administration.

== Education ==
Levinson graduated from San Francisco University High School. He received an A.B. from Harvard University, and a Ph.D. from Columbia University.

== Career and research ==
Levinson began his career as a public finance economist, studying the role of government in the U. S. economy. In the early 2000s he developed his specialization in environmental issues. His research considers the degree to which US companies avoid pollution regulations by importing dirty products; an explanation of why pollution is worse for middle-income countries; and how to use self-reported happiness measures to put a dollar value on air quality. He has argued that two priorities, the environment and justice, while both worthy, "require different policy tools," and that there are pitfalls to trying to combine them in one effort or program. Some of his arguments can seem counterintuitive, such that under current auto regulations people who don't drive much can reduce national gasoline consumption -- and pollution -- by purchasing gas guzzlers instead of more fuel-efficient cars.

His published research includes a 2001 study in the Journal of Public Economics showing how the environmental Kuznets curve can be explained by a one-person, two-good model without market failures. In 2009 in the American Economic Review, Levinson showed how "shifting polluting industries overseas explains only a minor part -- less than 10 percent -- of the cleanup of US manufacturing." His 2016 research, also in the American Economic Review, questions how much energy building energy codes really save. A 2019 study in the Journal of the Association of Environmental and Resource Economists demonstrates that "energy efficiency standards are more regressive than energy taxes."

He edits the Journal of the Association of Environmental and Resource Economists, and is a Research Associate at the National Bureau of Economic Research. While on leave from Georgetown in 2010–11, he served as a Senior Economist at the White House Council of Economic Advisers. More recently, from 2022 to 2024 he served as Deputy Assistant Secretary for Climate and Energy Economics at the Department of the Treasury, where he received the department's Distinguished Service Award. In 2022 he received the Georgetown University Department of Economics Excellence in Teaching Award.

== Media engagement with his work ==
Levinson's research has been noted in the media, for example by economist Andrew Oswald at the University of Warwick, writing to the Financial Times about how much "green" variables affect well-being. Environmental lawyer Bryan C. Williamson writing for The Regulatory Review, a publication of the Penn Program on Regulation, notes how "changes in the composition of goods manufactured in the U.S. may explain how emissions can decline despite increased manufacturing output." Technology journalist Brad Plumer covered Levinson's research into California's energy use. Economist Jason Russell, currently the managing editor of Reason magazine, interrogated his analysis of why green building codes often don't save energy. Ronald Bailey, the libertarian science correspondent for Reason, addresses his research on which is worse for poor Americans, energy efficiency standards, or energy taxes. Danish political scientist and author Bjørn Lomborg, president of the Copenhagen Consensus Center think tank, cited his work, writing "There was no evidence, Levinson concluded, that homes constructed since California instituted its building energy codes used less electricity today than homes built before the codes came into effect." Levinson has been featured on the Freakonomics podcast.

== Selected grants ==
- The Economics of Interjurisdictional Hazardous Waste Transport.
- Deconstructing the Environmental Kuznets Curve (co-pi with M. Scott Taylor).
- Valuing Air Quality Using Happiness Data.
- Environmental Engel Curves.
