= A Quiet Place (disambiguation) =

A Quiet Place is a 2018 film.

A Quiet Place may also refer to:

- A Quiet Place (film series)
- A Quiet Place (album), a 1987 album by Roseanna Vitro
- A Quiet Place (opera), a 1983 American opera with music by Leonard Bernstein and a libretto by Stephen Wadsworth
- A Quiet Place: The Road Ahead, a 2024 survival horror game
- A Quiet Place, a 1971 novel by the Japanese mystery writer Seichō Matsumoto, original title: 聞かなかった場所 (Kikanakatta Basho)

== See also ==
- "The Quiet Place", a 2004 song by Swedish heavy metal band In Flames
- Quiet Places, a 1973 album by Buffy Sainte-Marie
- "Quiet Place", an alternative name for "Man Next Door", a song by the Paragons
