= Brooks Tucker =

American government official

Brooks D. Tucker
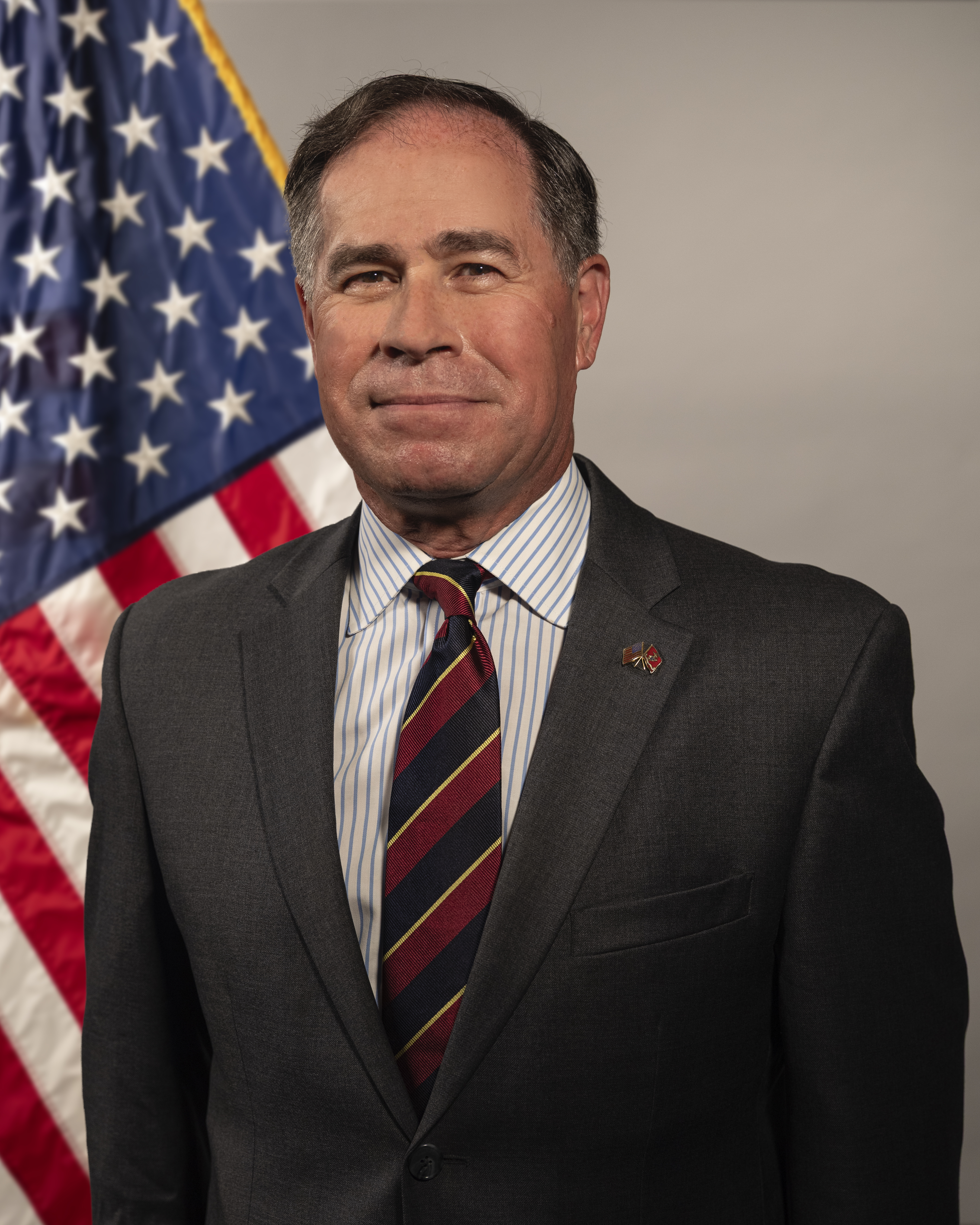

Assistant Secretary of Veterans Affairs for Congressional and Legislative Affairs
- In office August 10, 2017 – January 20, 2021
- President: Donald Trump
- Preceded by: Joan M. Evans
- Succeeded by: Patricia L. Ross

Personal details
- Education: University of Maryland

Military service
- Allegiance: United States
- Branch/service: United States Marine Corps
- Rank: Lieutenant Colonel
- Battles/wars: Gulf War; Iraq War; Operation Enduring Freedom
- Awards: Meritorious Service Medal; Navy Commendation Medal (2); Navy Achievement Medal; Combat Action Ribbon

Brooks D. Tucker is a former American government official who most recently served as the Chief of Staff for the Department of Veterans Affairs from April 29, 2020, to January 20, 2021, and as Assistant Secretary for Congressional and Legislative Affairs for the Department of Veterans Affairs from August 10, 2017, to January 20, 2021. For his contributions and accomplishments in the Senior Executive Service, he was awarded the Exceptional Service Medal by the Secretary of Veterans Affairs.

Tucker is a retired lieutenant colonel and infantry officer in the United States Marine Corps who served in Operation Desert Shield/Desert Storm, Operation Iraqi Freedom, and Operation Enduring Freedom (Afghanistan). During his military service, he received the Meritorious Service Medal, Navy Commendation Medal with Combat Distinguishing Device and two gold stars in lieu of subsequent awards, Navy Achievement Medal, and Combat Action Ribbon.

Prior to his presidential appointment, Tucker was a senior adviser to the Secretary of Veterans Affairs. Tucker previously served on Donald Trump's 2016 presidential transition team and as senior policy adviser for national security and veterans' affairs for U.S. Senator Richard Burr.

He was formerly an investment adviser for Deutsche Bank and Merrill Lynch.

In 2023, Tucker authored the chapter on the Department of Veterans Affairs for the ninth edition of the Heritage Foundation's book Mandate for Leadership, which provides the policy agenda for Project 2025.

In April, 2025, Tucker was appointed to the American Battle Monuments Commission.
