= Kelu Chao =

Taiwanese American journalist

- 趙克露
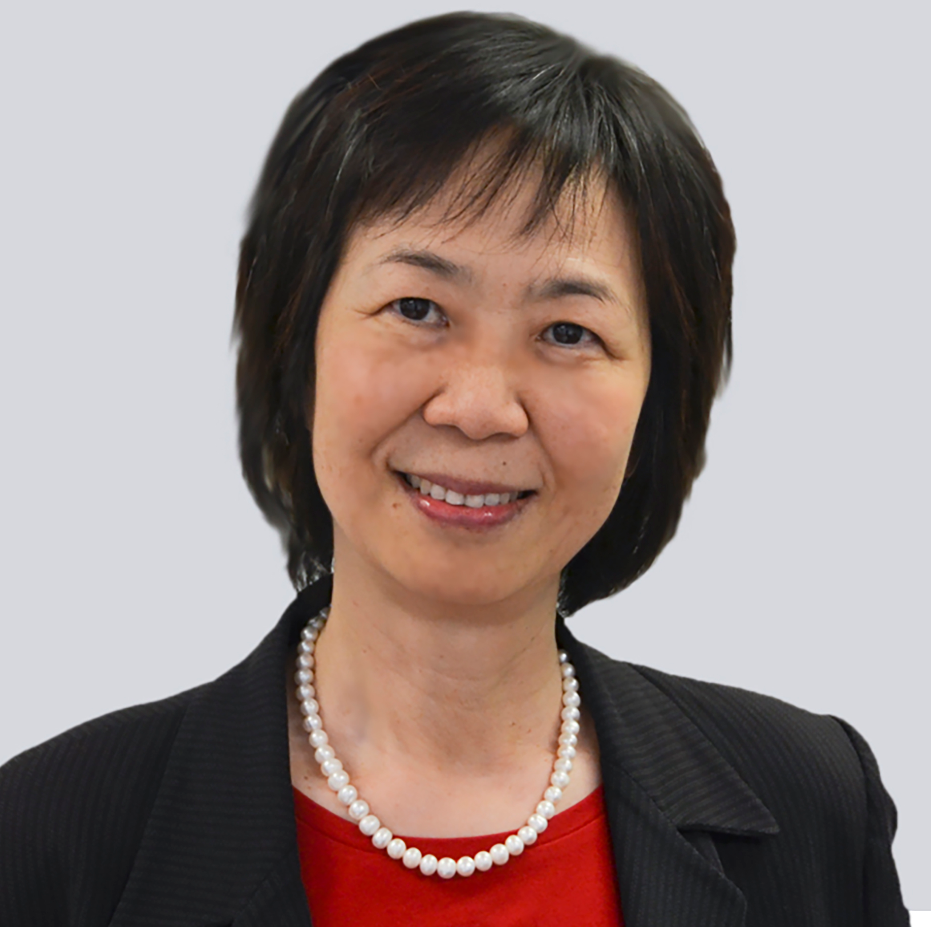

CEO of the U.S. Agency for Global Media
- Acting
- In office January 20, 2021 – December 29, 2022
- President: Joe Biden
- Preceded by: Michael Pack
- Succeeded by: Amanda Bennett

Personal details
- Born: Taiwan
- Education: National Chengchi University (BA); Kent State University (MA)

Kelu Chao (Chinese: 趙克露) is a Taiwanese-American journalist and the deputy CEO of the U.S. Agency for Global Media (USAGM). She was previously the acting interim CEO of USAGM from January 20, 2021, to December 29, 2022.

== Early life and education ==
Kelu Chao was born in Taiwan and graduated from Taipei Municipal Zhongshan Girls High School (Chinese: 中山女高). Her father, Chao Ting-Chun, was the vice president of one of Taiwan's oldest newspapers, the Central Daily News.

After graduating in 1975 from National Chengchi University with a bachelor's degree in journalism, Chao moved to the U.S. and earned a master's degree from Kent State University.

== Career ==
=== Journalism ===
Chao has worked for more than 40 years for the Voice of America (VOA).

She was the VOA's first Language Programming Director from 2001 to 2007. She also worked as a VOA editor, VOA's Mandarin Service Chief, VOA's East Asia Division Director, VOA's Hong Kong Bureau Chief, a field reporter, and radio announcer.

As a field reporter, she reported for VOA on the period leading to the 1989 Tiananmen Square protests and massacre in Beijing.

Chao has received more than 30 awards as a VOA programmer, including from the New York Radio Festival and the Asian Broadcasting Union.

=== USAGM ===
She was appointed on January 20, 2021, by President Joe Biden to lead the USAGM as interim CEO, replacing the Trump appointee Michael Pack. She is the first woman to hold the top position at USAGM.

Chao's personnel management after taking office was questioned by seven Republican members of Congress. The seven members of Congress also demanded that the correspondence from several directors of the United States World Media Organization and VOA be provided on specific dates to investigate the details of the recruitment of Setareh Derakhshesh.

When Amanda Bennett was confirmed by the U.S. Senate in September 2022 (to be sworn on December 6, 2022) as the CEO of USAGM, Chao issued a statement commending the decision. "A proven journalist, public servant, and business leader, Amanda has both the vision and experience to build on our progress, while equipping USAGM to anticipate and confront threats to independent media and reach audiences in need," said Chao. "Now more than ever, people across the world are depending on USAGM's fact-based news to triumph over increasing misinformation, disinformation, and censorship. I join our entire agency in welcoming Amanda back to serve during this crucial moment for freedom and democracy." Chao subsequently assumed the role of deputy CEO of the agency.
