= Federation for American Immigration Reform =

Anti-immigration non-profit organization

- Formation: 1979; 47 years ago
- Founder: John Tanton; Otis L. Graham Jr. Sidney Swensrud
- Founded at: Washington, D.C., U.S.
- Tax ID no.: 52-1136126
- Legal status: Non-profit tax exempt
- Headquarters: Washington, D.C., U.S.
- Region served: United States
- Members: (2017)
- Key people: Daniel A. Stein, president (1988-)
- Affiliations: Immigration Reform Law Institute (IRLI) (est. 1987) FAIR Congressional Task Force (FCTF) (est. 2004); Center for Immigration Studies (CIS) (est. 1985)
- Budget: Revenue: $11,157,713; Expenses: $11,246,727 (FYE December 2016)
- Website: fairus.org

The Federation for American Immigration Reform (FAIR) is a nonprofit, anti-immigration organization in the United States. The group publishes position papers, organizes events, and runs campaigns in order to advocate for changes in U.S. immigration policy. The Southern Poverty Law Center classifies FAIR as a hate group with ties to white supremacist groups.

FAIR was founded in 1979 by Michigan surgeon and white nationalist John Tanton. Other co-founders include Otis Graham and former Gulf Oil chief executive officer Sidney Swensrud. It is headquartered in Washington, D.C.

== History ==
The "founder of the modern immigration reform movement"—John Tanton, an ophthalmologist in Petoskey, Michigan—"saw a threat coming in the soaring rates of immigration" and that the "environment was threatened by overpopulation". Frustrated by the lack of interest of his "liberal colleagues in groups such as Planned Parenthood and the Sierra Club where he was actively engaged, he helped establish "three major national groups"—FAIR, Numbers USA and the Center for Immigration Studies—to fight to reduce [legal and illegal] immigration."

Tanton—along with University of North Carolina professor Otis Graham and former Gulf Oil CEO, Sydney Swensrud—established FAIR in 1979. In 1982 Tanton also established U.S. Inc, a foundation chaired by Tanton with financial support from Cordelia Scaife May which would over the years, serve as a funding conduit for FAIR, Numbers USA, the Center for Immigration Studies, and many other groups.

FAIR's first executive director was Roger Conner. Other co-founders included Sharon Barnes, Jay Harris and Stewart Mott (of the Stewart R. Mott Foundation) and William Paddock, dean of Zamorano the Pan American School of Agriculture. Dan Stein has been president of FAIR since 1988.

In American Immigration: An Encyclopedia of Political, Social, and Cultural Change, Brian N. Fry described Tanton as the "leader of the drive to restrict immigration" starting in the mid-1970s. Fry described those who favored maintaining or increasing immigration numbers as "expansionists" and those who sought to reduce them as "restrictionists." Fry traced "restrictions roots" to a surprising surge in illegal and legal immigration—the "new immigration"—following the 1964 termination of the Bracero Program and the enactment of the Immigration and Nationality Act of 1965.

Tanton as President of Zero Population Growth from 1975 to 1977 attempted to get members to "support immigration restrictions." When they were unwilling, he launched FAIR with seed money in 1979.

Throughout the 1980s FAIR's lobbying efforts on Capitol Hill met with more success as did their direct mail campaigns. FAIR received funds from donors such as Cordelia Scaife May (1928–2005) through her Laurel Foundation and the Pioneer Fund which contributed $1.2 million to FAIR in the 1980s and early 1990s.

Following negative publicity about FAIR receiving funds from Pioneer Fund when they were revealed in a Los Angeles Times article, FAIR stopped "receiving grants" from Pioneer that required "public disclosure." The SPLC claimed FAIR continued to "receive private financial support from Pioneer's leaders for several years."

Tanton had wanted FAIR to focus on issues related to Hispanics in the United States, such as "cultural division" and bilingualism. He was unable to convince FAIR's board of directors to shift their focus. However, FAIR helped Tanton establish U.S. English as the umbrella organization for "projects pertaining to overpopulation, immigration, and the environment." Through the work of Senator Samuel Ichiye Hayakawa (R-CA) (1906–1992) and Tanton, U.S. English became a well-organized and well-funded official movement resulting in twenty-two states enacting official language laws to protect English between 1981 and 1997. From 2007 to 2015, Julie Kirchner was FAIR's executive director.

In 1991 historian Eric Hobsbawm explained the rise of FAIR, US English and English first in the United States in the 1980s as part of a larger political phenomenon of xenophobia that "feeds on hostility towards the new mass migrations". He quoted a Czech historian, "Where old social relations become unstable, amid the rise of general insecurity, belonging to a common language and culture may become the only certainty in society, the only value beyond ambiguity and doubt."

In 1994, FAIR supported California Proposition 187.

In 2004, the Federation for American Immigration Reform cooperated with the group called Protect Arizona Now in order to support the passage of Proposition 200, which shares similarities with California's Proposition 187 as to which undocumented immigrants are restricted from public benefits and voting because they are most likely unable to provide the required proof of citizenship. It also made the crime of a public official not reporting illegal status a class 2 misdemeanor.

In 2007, FAIR successfully campaign against Bush's proposed Immigration Reform which represented "a systemic overhaul including a path to citizenship for most illegal immigrants." "FAIR rallied talk show hosts...The Center for Immigration Studies published "studies of the bill's perceived flaws" and "Numbers USA jammed the Capitol's phones." FAIR had become the "most important organization [in the United States] fueling the backlash against immigration" and Tanton was perceived as the leader. As a result, liberal groups who opposed FAIR focused on Tanton who was at that time "in his 32nd year on the board." Tanton was concerned that US birthrates had dropped "below replacement level." In 1986 Tanton wrote memos to FAIR colleagues—which became known as the WITAN memos—predicting a "Latin onslaught" and worried that high Latino birth rates and low US birthrates would lead "the present majority to hand over its political power to a group that is simply more fertile". He was concerned Latinos would "bring with them the tradition of the mordida ['bribe'], the lack of involvement in public affairs." He asked, "What are the differences in educability between Hispanics (with their 50% dropout rate) and Asiatics (with their excellent school records and long tradition of scholarship)?" The memos—which became known as the WITAN memos—were leaked to the press in 1988.

He warned that unless Latino immigration was restricted it would ultimately "lead to linguistic, economic, racial and religious "apartheid" in the United States." He cautioned, "I've come to the point of view that for European-American society and culture to persist requires a European-American majority, and a clear one at that." When the WITAN memos were leaked to the press in 1988, Tanton eventually had to resign from U.S. English. although he denied the accusations.

FAIR has created several affiliated groups, including the Immigration Reform Law Institute (IRLI) and the FAIR Congressional Task Force (FCTF) as a 501(c)(4). The Center for Immigration Studies (CIS) was spun off from FAIR in 1985.

FAIR has held an annual "Hold Their Feet to the Fire" (F2F) event since 2007 in Washington, D.C. In 2008, Lou Dobbs, a regular (F2F) attendee, broadcast on live television from the event's rally, commended FAIR. He was fired from CNN in 2009 and hired at Fox the next year, to run a similar show.

In September 2009 two divisive issues—immigration and health care—became "politically linked" when partisan health reform opponents challenged what they perceived as subsidized health care for illegal immigrants. By early September the bipartisan Gang of Six negotiations on a compromise for the health care reform bill, had fallen apart. Senators who had previously "embraced the framework" were convinced by Senate Republican Leader Mitch McConnell that they were being politically unwise. Their rhetoric turned "shrill" and "anti-reform" with one Senator talking about "death panels that would kill grandma." The furor on immigration "escalated" into what The Washington Post called a "proxy war." FAIR's annual "Hold their Feet to the Fire" event" in Washington on September 14 and 15, was described by The Post as a "Capitol Hill lobbying push..[with] 47 conservative radio hosts holding a 'town hall of the airwaves'... [highlighting] the costs of illegal immigration."

America's Voice's Director Frank Sharry said, "conservative activists" had attempted to "intimidate" Congress by "tapping into a thin but vocal vein of populist anger... We didn't call them out last time, we thought we were in a political debate. Now we realize it's part political debate and... part culture war. These talk-show guys and FAIR, this isn't about immigration policy, as much as they think there are way too many Latinos in this country and they want to get rid of a couple of million of them." The SPLC strongly denounced FAIR and its founder. FAIR president Dan Stein stated in The Post article that the SPLC had "decided to engage in unsubstantiated, invidious name-calling, smearing millions of people in this movement who simply want to see the law enforced and, frankly, lower levels of immigration" and that "America's Voice and allied groups were 'juvenile mud throwers who seem unprepared to engage in serious public debate'.

In a 2011 article in The New York Times, a former aide to President Ronald Reagan, Linda Chavez, was cited as saying that 77-year-old Tanton was "the most influential unknown man in America." In a 2011 interview published in The New York Times and The Houston Chronicle, FAIR's President Dan Stein said, "Is FAIR responsible for everything [John Tanton] said in his private correspondence? No, I love John, but he's had no significant control over FAIR for years."

By the end of 2016, FAIR's annual budget reached $11.2 million.

In May 2017, Julie Kirchner, FAIR's executive director since 2005, was named as ombudsman of U.S. Citizenship and Immigration Services Ombudsman reporting to the Department of Homeland Security.

A 2017 FAIR report claimed that undocumented immigrants in the United States cost taxpayers approximately $134.9 billion. This report included the children of undocumented immigrants, even those who were U.S. citizens, in the cost calculation. According to the Associated Press, "the estimate was criticized for making broad generalizations and other major methodological flaws."

== Controversy ==
The Southern Poverty Law Center (SPLC) currently classifies FAIR as a hate group, citing among other things the organization's anti-Latino and anti-Catholic attitudes, its acceptance of $1.2 million from a racist foundation, the Pioneer Fund, its hiring as key officials men who also joined white supremacist groups, having board members who also write regularly for hate publications, its promotion of racist conspiracy theories, and the white supremacist beliefs of its founder. In 1982, John Tanton wrote "As Whites see their power and control over their lives declining, will they simply go quietly into the night? Or will there be an explosion." The SPLC issued an intelligence report in 2007, after which they added FAIR to its list of hate groups.

FAIR responded to this charge by stating that there is no factual basis for the accusation; that FAIR has compiled a long record of mainstream credibility and respect on immigration issues and has always opposed discrimination on the basis of race, ethnicity, or religion; and that the accusation is an "act of desperation, resulting from the SPLC's failure to convince the American people of their viewpoint."

In August 2018, FAIR's former press secretary, Joe Gomez, filed a complaint with the Washington, D.C. Office of Human Rights, alleging racist, xenophobic, and ableist harassment at FAIR. Gomez's attorney, Chris Bell, accused FAIR of misrepresenting the settlement to media outlets by wrongly saying the D.C. Office of Human Rights dismissed the complaint because it had no merit. Instead, the office dismissed the complaint because a settlement was reached, according to Bell. "If they continue to misrepresent the truth, I'm going to set the record straight," Bell said. "There was never an agreement [FAIR] could go out and misrepresent the truth."

FAIR’s comment, attributable to Dan Stein, president of FAIR: “FAIR stands by its position that the allegations made by Mr. Gomez with respect to his treatment here were always without foundation. FAIR believes that this retraction by Mr. Gomez is a vindication of this position. FAIR endeavors to treat all its employees with dignity and respect.”

== See also ==
- Center for Immigration Studies
- NumbersUSA
- You Don't Speak for Me
