= Lori Schiller =

- Born: Lori Jo Baach; April 26, 1959 (age 66); Michigan, U.S.
- Education: Tufts University
- Spouse: Steven Douglas Baach
- Parent(s): Marvin and Nancy Schiller

Lori Schiller (born April 26, 1959), now Lori Jo Baach, is the author of the memoir The Quiet Room-- A Journey out of the Torment of Madness. When she was 17, she began to hear voices, and was later diagnosed with schizo-affective disorder. The Quiet Room--A Journey out of the Torment and Madness follows her story as well as her family and friends as they navigate her mental disorder.

== Early life ==
Schiller was born in Michigan on April 26, 1959. She was raised by her parents, Marvin and Nancy, and had two younger brothers, Mark and Steven. She moved to Chicago and Los Angeles before moving to Scarsdale, New York where she was raised until college. She graduated from Scarsdale High School with an average GPA of 3.9 while heading the prom committee and serving as literary editor of the school magazine. From there, she went on to study at Tufts University in Massachusetts. During the summer of 1976, she was working as a counselor at Lincoln Farm summer camp, and began to hear voices telling her to die, a symptom of schizophrenia.

== Personal life ==
On February 24, 2002, she married Steven Douglas Baach in Boca Raton. They live together in Lake Worth, Florida, where Schiller is a peer specialist at the Henderson Mental Health Center. Schiller continues to take 31 pills a day for her schizophrenia to minimize her symptoms, including clozapine, her final try at medication. She continues to advocate for those with mental illness along with her parents, Marvin and Nancy Schiller who started a program called The Welcome Home Center in conjunction with Ruth Rales Jewish Family Services in Boca Raton, having a drop-in center for individuals with mental illness.

== Work ==
Schiller is the author of The Quiet Room-- A Journey out of the Torment of Madness, originally published by Warner Books in 1994, written with Amanda Bennett. The memoir chronicles her battle with mental illness. The memoir is an alternate selection of The Literary Guild and Doubleday Book Club. The memoir includes chapters written by her therapist, her brothers, her parents, and herself. It follows Schiller's journey with schizo-affective disorder, in and out of hospitals, multiple suicide attempts, and multiple treatment plans. Schiller describes her struggle with mental illness and the impact it had on her family.

Schiller now teaches a course on schizophrenia to doctors, nurses, patients at hospitals around the country, including the Westchester Division of New York Hospital, where she spent time during her hospitalizations. She now speaks to local police in crisis team intervention education, has been a board member of her local affiliate of the National Alliance on Mental Illness since 1998, and teaches a ten-week course for NAMI, helping those with mental illness. She is on the board of directors of the South County Mental Health Center, and in 2009 was named Florida Council for Community Mental Health Peer Specialist of the Year.

== Movie adaptation ==
In 1995, Schiller signed an $40,000 contract with Touchstone Pictures for a movie to be based on the book, although it has not yet become a film.
