= 2009–2011 Toyota vehicle recalls =

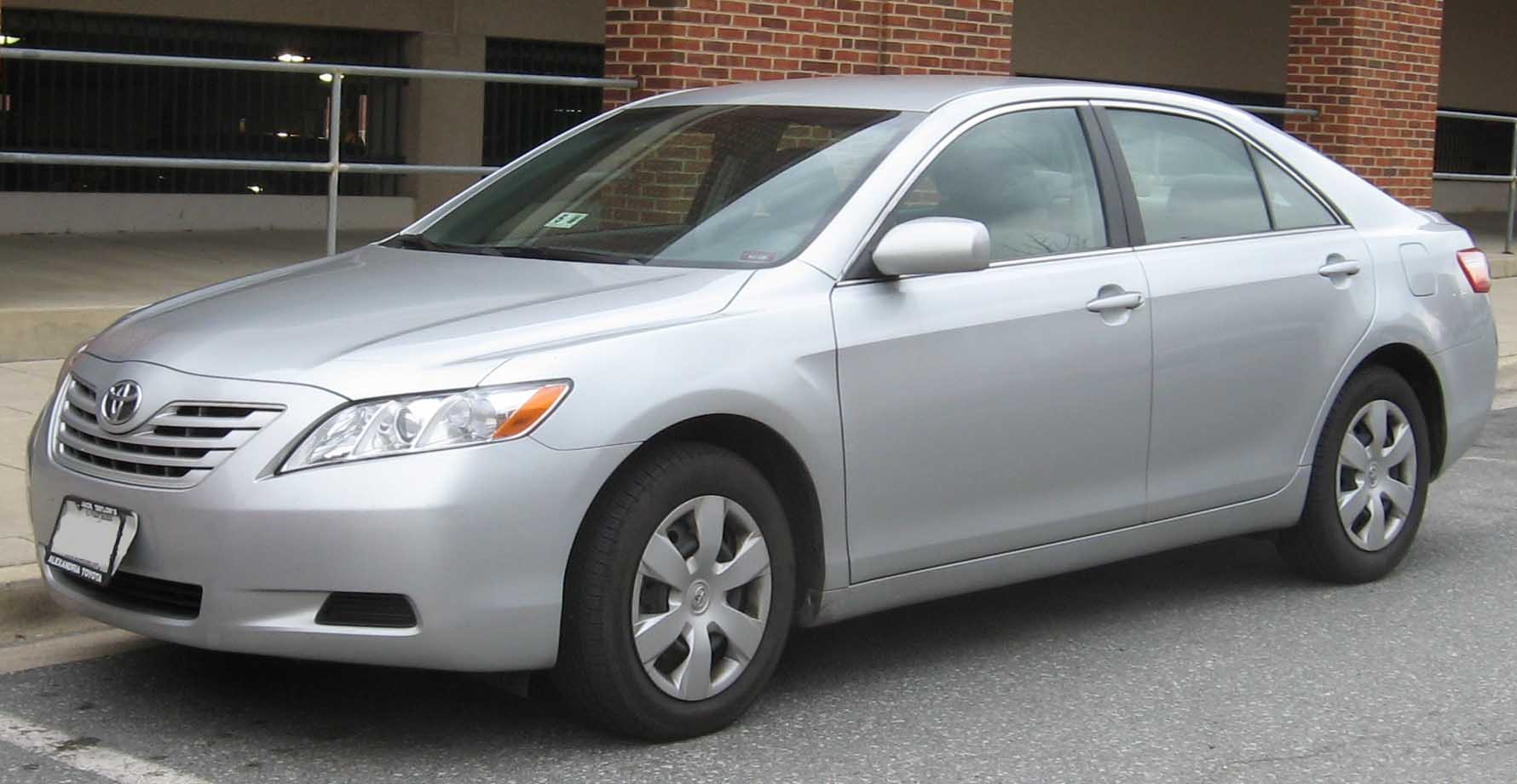

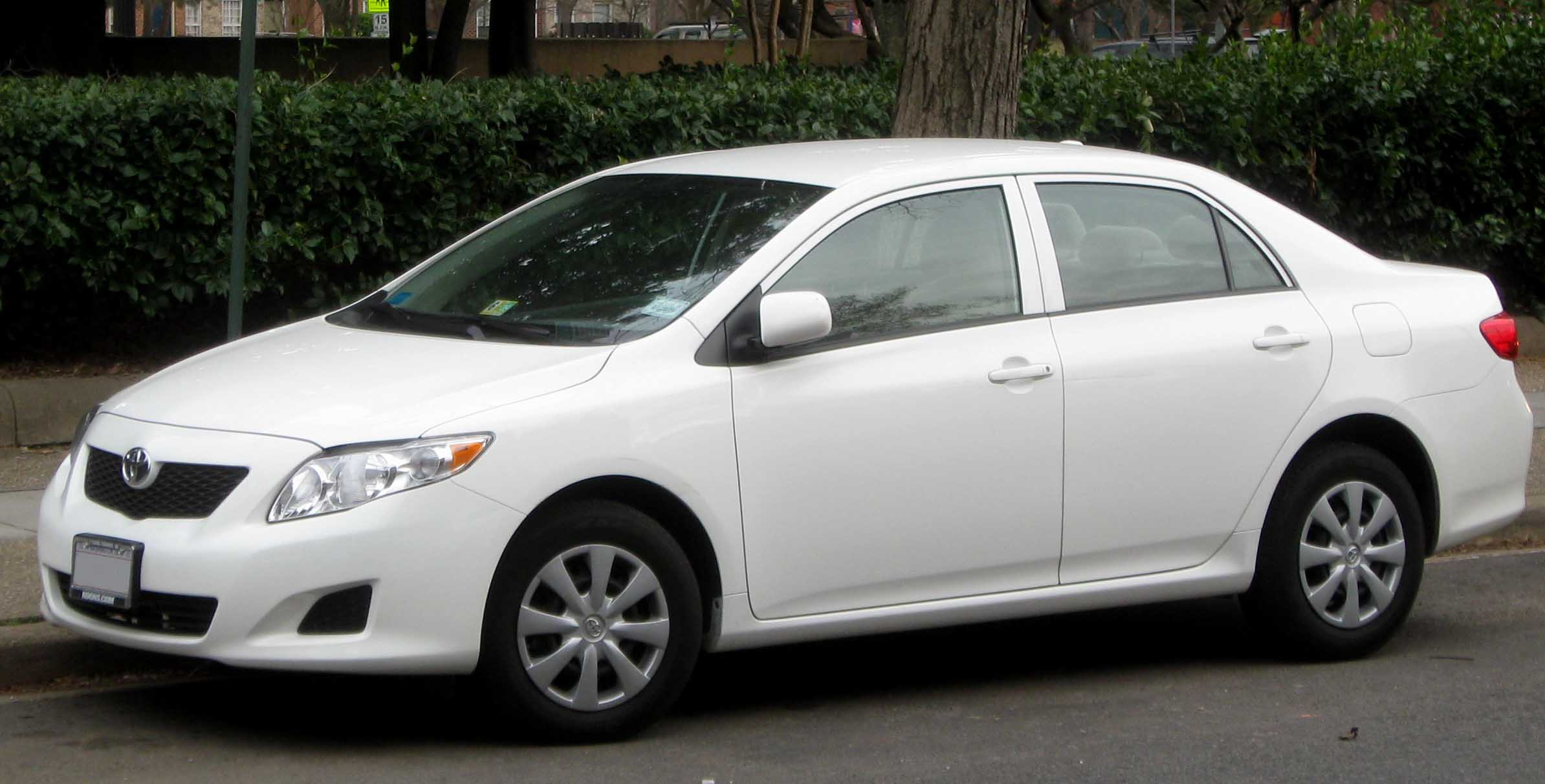
Two of the vehicles under recall: the Toyota Camry (XV40) at top, and the Toyota Corolla (E140) at bottom

The 2009–11 Toyota vehicle recalls involved a series of global corrective actions to automobiles by the Japanese manufacturer, Toyota Motor Corporation. Approximately 9 million vehicles were affected due to reports of sudden unintended acceleration. The crisis, which affected Toyota's reputation, was initially attributed to mechanical defects: "pedal entrapment" caused by floor mats and "sticking accelerator pedals" resulting from friction in the pedal assembly. However, litigation in 2013 challenged these findings. Expert testimony suggested that software problems in the car's Electronic Throttle Control System could trigger unintended acceleration. The complex interplay of mechanical failures, software vulnerabilities, and regulatory scrutiny culminated in a significant safety event and penalties for the automaker.

== History ==
The first recall occurred at the end of 2009 and the start of 2010. Toyota initiated the recalls, the first two with the assistance of the U.S. National Highway Traffic Safety Administration (NHTSA), after reports that several vehicles experienced unintended acceleration. The first recall, on November 2, 2009, was to correct a possible incursion of an incorrect or out-of-place front driver's side floor mat into the foot pedal well, which can cause pedal entrapment. The second recall, on January 21, 2010, began after some crashes were shown not to have been caused by floor mat incursion. This latter defect was identified as a possible mechanical sticking of the accelerator pedal, causing unintended acceleration, which Toyota referred to as Sticking Accelerator Pedal. Toyota initiated the original action in their Defect Information Report, dated October 5, 2009, amended January 27, 2010. Following the floor mat and accelerator pedal recalls, Toyota also issued a separate recall for hybrid anti-lock brake software in February 2010.

As of January 28, 2010, Toyota had announced recalls of approximately 5.2 million vehicles for the pedal entrapment/floor mat problem, and an additional 2.3 million vehicles for the accelerator pedal problem. Approximately 1.7 million vehicles are subject to both. Certain related Lexus models and the Pontiac Vibe (the Vibe being a General Motors-rebadged Toyota Matrix) were also affected. The next day, Toyota widened the recall to include 1.8 million vehicles in Europe and 75,000 in China. By then, the worldwide total number of cars recalled by Toyota stood at 9 million. Sales of multiple recalled models were suspended for several weeks as a result of the accelerator pedal recall, with the vehicles awaiting replacement parts.

As of January 2010, 21 deaths were alleged due to the pedal problem since 2000, but following the January 28 recall, additional NHTSA complaints brought the alleged total to 37. The number of alleged victims and reported problems sharply increased following the recall announcements, which were heavily covered by U.S. media, although the causes of individual reports were difficult to verify. Government officials, automotive experts, Toyota, and members of the general public contested the scope of the sudden acceleration issue and the veracity of victim and problem reports. Various parties attributed sudden unintended acceleration reports to mechanical, electric, and driver error causes. Some U.S. owners that had their recalled vehicles repaired still reported accelerator pedal issues, leading to investigations and the finding of improper repairs. The recalls further led to additional NHTSA and Toyota investigations, along with multiple lawsuits.

On February 8, 2011, the NHTSA, in collaboration with NASA, released its findings into the investigation on the Toyota drive-by-wire throttle system. After a 10-month search, NASA and NHTSA scientists found no electronic defect in Toyota vehicles. Driver error or pedal misapplication was found responsible for most of the incidents. The report ended by stating, "Our conclusion is Toyota's problems were mechanical, not electrical." This included sticking accelerator pedals and pedals caught under floor mats.

However, on October 24, 2013, a jury ruled against Toyota and found that unintended acceleration could have been caused due to deficiencies in the drive-by-wire throttle system or the Electronic Throttle Control System (ETCS). Michael Barr of the Barr Group testified that NASA had not been able to complete its examination of Toyota's ETCS and that Toyota did not follow best practices for real time life-critical software, and that a single bit flip, which can be caused by cosmic rays could cause unintended acceleration. As well, the run-time stack of the real-time operating system was not large enough, and it was possible for the stack to grow large enough to overwrite data that could cause unintended acceleration. As a result, Toyota has entered into settlement talks with its plaintiffs.

== Recall timeline ==
- Sep 26, 2007 – US: 55,000 Toyota Camry and ES 350 cars in "all-weather" floor mat recall.
- Nov 02, 2009 – US: 3.8 million Toyota and Lexus vehicles again recalled due to floor mat problem, this time for all driver's side mats.
- Nov 26, 2009 – US: floor mat recall amended to include brake override and increased to 4.2 million vehicles.
- Jan 21, 2010 – US: 2.3 million Toyota vehicles recalled due to faulty accelerator pedals (of those, 2.1 million already involved in floor mat recall).
- Jan 27, 2010 – US: 1.1 million Toyotas added to amended floor mat recall.
- Jan 29, 2010 – Europe, China: 1.8 million Toyotas added to faulty accelerator pedal recall.
- Feb 08, 2010 – Worldwide: 436,000 hybrid vehicles in brake recall following 200 reports of Prius brake glitches.
- Feb 08, 2010 – US: 7,300 model year 2010 Camry vehicles recalled over potential brake tube problems.
- Feb 12, 2010 – US: 8,000 MY 2010 4WD Tacoma pick-up trucks recalled over concerns about possible defective front drive shafts.
- Apr 16, 2010 – US: 600,000 MY 1998–2010 Toyota Sienna for possible corrosion of spare tire carrier cable.
- Apr 19, 2010 – World: 21,000 MY 2010 Toyota Land Cruiser Prado and 13,000 Lexus GX 460 SUV's recalled to reprogram the stability control system.
- Apr 28, 2010 – US: 50,000 MY 2003 Toyota Sequoia recalled to reprogram the stability control system.
- May 21, 2010 – Japan: 4,509, US: 7,000 MY 2010 LS for steering system software update
- July 5, 2010 – World: 270,000 Crown and Lexus models for valve springs with potential production issue.
- July 29, 2010 – US: 412,000 Avalons and LX 470s for replacement of steering column components.
- August 28, 2010 – U.S. & Canada: approximately 1.13 million Toyota Corolla and Toyota Matrix vehicles produced between 2005 and 2008 for Engine Control Modules (ECM) that may have been improperly manufactured.
- February 8, 2011 – US: NASA and NHTSA inquiry reveals that there were no electronic faults in Toyota cars that would have caused acceleration issues. However, accelerator pedal entrapments remain a problem.
- February 22, 2011 – US: Toyota recalls an additional 2.17 million vehicles for accelerator pedals that become trapped on floor hardware.

== Floor mat recall ==
On September 26, 2007, Toyota recalled 55,000 sets of heavy-duty rubber floor mats from the Toyota Camry and ES 350 sedans. The recalled mats were of the optional "all-weather" type. NHTSA stated that the recall was due to the risk that unsecured mats could move forward and trap the accelerator pedal.

External image
- Accelerator trapped by unsecured floor mat, causing wide-open throttle (Associated Press)

On August 28, 2009, a two-car collision killed four people riding in a Lexus dealer-provided loaner ES 350 in San Diego, California. The NHTSA released a safety investigation report on October 25, finding that the accident vehicle was wrongly fitted with all-weather rubber floor mats meant for the RX 400h SUV, and that these mats were not secured by either of the two retaining clips. The brake hardware also showed signs of heavy braking consistent with a stuck accelerator pedal. The report stated that the accelerator pedal's hinge did not allow for relieving obstructions, and the dashboard lacked directions for the three-second emergency press of the push button keyless ignition. NHTSA investigators also recovered the accident vehicle's accelerator pedal, which was still "bonded" to the SUV floor mat. The return spring action of the accelerator pedal was found to be "smooth and unencumbered."

Another investigation conducted by the San Diego County Sheriff's Department found that three days before the crash, another customer had complained to the dealership about the floor mat trapping the same loaner car's accelerator pedal while driving. The prior driver had switched to neutral and tugged on the floor mat, which released the accelerator.

On November 2, 2009, the NHTSA denied a petition to reopen previously closed unintended acceleration investigations of Toyota vehicles, stating they had already been thoroughly investigated making it unlikely for the NHTSA to reach any new conclusions. Later that day Toyota issued a voluntary recall of 3.8 million vehicles, with a letter sent to owners asking them to remove the driver floor mat and not replace it with any other type of mat. In its November 2, 2009 recall announcement, Toyota appeared to claim the floor mats were solely at fault, stating, "The question of unintended acceleration involving Toyota and Lexus vehicles has been repeatedly and thoroughly investigated by NHTSA, without any finding of defect other than the risk from an unsecured or incompatible driver's floor mat", but the NHTSA issued another statement stating, "This matter is not closed until Toyota has effectively addressed the defect", the letter was "inaccurate and misleading", and that, "removal of the floor mats is simply an interim measure, not a remedy of the underlying defect in the vehicles."

=== Affected vehicles for floor mat recall ===
According to Toyota USA, the floor mat recall is confined to the following models:

- MY 2005–2010 Toyota Avalon
- MY 2007–2010 Toyota Camry
- MY 2009–2010 Toyota Corolla
- MY 2008–2010 Toyota Highlander
- MY 2009–2010 Toyota Matrix
- MY 2004–2009 Toyota Prius
- MY 2005–2010 Toyota Tacoma
- MY 2007–2010 Toyota Tundra
- MY 2009–2010 Toyota Venza
- MY 2007–2010 Lexus ES 350
- MY 2006–2010 Lexus IS 250
- MY 2009–2010 Pontiac Vibe

Toyota UK states that the floor mat recall affects U.S. models only.

=== Amended recall to include accelerator pedal ===
On November 25, 2009, Toyota amended its floor mat recall involving the same 3.8 million vehicles sold in North America. Toyota will reconfigure the accelerator pedal, replace the all-weather floor mats with thinner mats, and install a brake override system to prevent unwanted acceleration. The brake override system, also called "brake to idle" and already a common design in German cars, allows the driver to override the accelerator by hitting the brakes. In a follow-up statement, the NHTSA announced the November 25, 2009 recall details as a "vehicle-based remedy" to address the floor mat pedal issue. According to Toyota, the repair work done under the amended recall for floor mat incursion problems are as follows:

- The accelerator pedal will be shaved to reduce the risk of floor mat entrapment.
- All-weather floor mats will be removed and replaced with a newly designed mat.
- A brake override system, which cuts engine power if both the accelerator and brake are detected as pressed, will be installed.
- A replacement pedal with the same shape as the modified pedal would be made available at a later date.
- For drivers who have existing all-weather floor mats but do not need or want the newly designed all-weather floor mat, the existing mat will be removed and the owner reimbursed.

In its November 25, 2009 announcement, Toyota stated that dealers would be instructed first on how to reshape the accelerator pedal for the repair. Installation of the brake override began in January 2010 on Toyota Camry and Lexus ES 350 models, the vehicles with the most units included in the recall.

== Accelerator pedal recall ==
On January 21, 2010, Toyota initiated a second recall, this time in response to reports of accelerator pedals sticking in cars without floor mats. The company had received three such complaints in 2009. In its recall announcement, Toyota stated that:

The condition is rare and does not occur suddenly. It can occur when the pedal mechanism becomes worn and, in certain conditions, the accelerator pedal may become harder to depress, slower to return or, in the worst case, stuck in a partially depressed position.

A concurrent NHTSA press release identified the issue as the "Sticky Pedal Recall" and described the problem and remedy as follows:

- The accelerator pedal becomes harder to depress or slower to return to the closed position.
- The accelerator pedal may become stuck in a partially depressed position.
- Should the pedal become stuck while driving, drivers should switch to neutral and stop.
- A repair fix would be applied by the manufacturer to prevent the sticky pedal condition.
- A new pedal would later be made available to replace repaired pedals.

The January 21 recall announcement for the accelerator pedal problem covered 2.3 million vehicles sold in the U.S. Toyota then widened the recall to include 1.8 million vehicles in Europe and 75,000 in China. On January 26, Toyota announced that until they had finalized an appropriate remedy to address the potential for sticking accelerator pedals, sales would be suspended for selected vehicles.

On January 31, 2010, The Wall Street Journal reported that U.S. regulators cleared Toyota's proposed repair for the pedals and the company would resume production by February 8. On February 1, 2010, Toyota said that its dealers should get parts to fix the sticky accelerator pedal by the end of the week.

=== Affected vehicles and vehicle lines ===
According to the manufacturer, Toyota's accelerator pedal recall and suspension of sales in North America is confined to the following vehicles (vehicles affected are based on certain Vehicle Identification Numbers):

- MY 2005–2010 Toyota Avalon
- MY 2007–2010 Toyota Camry (excludes Camry Hybrid and some other models)
- MY 2009–2010 Toyota Corolla*
- MY 2010 Toyota Highlander* (excludes Highlander Hybrid)
- MY 2009–2010 Toyota Matrix
- MY 2009–2010 Toyota RAV4*
- MY 2008–2010 Toyota Sequoia
- MY 2007–2010 Toyota Tundra

On January 27, 2010, Toyota USA issued an expanded list of vehicles under recall including:

- MY 2008–2009 Toyota Highlander* (excludes Highlander Hybrid)
- MY 2009–2010 Toyota Venza

* vehicles built in Japan use Denso pedals and are not subject to the recall

On January 29, 2010, the Toyota recall was extended to Europe and China. The number of vehicles likely to be affected in Europe was unconfirmed but Toyota said it may reach up to 1.8 million. At the time of recall there had been 30 incidents involving the accelerator pedal problem in Europe.

The vehicles affected in Europe are:

- Feb 2005 – Aug 2009 Toyota Aygo (automatic models only)
- Nov 2008 – Nov 2009 Toyota iQ
- Nov 2005 – Sep 2009 Toyota Yaris
- Oct 2006 – Jan 2010 Toyota Auris
- Oct 2006 – Dec 2009 Toyota Corolla
- Feb 2009 – Jan 2010 Toyota Verso
- Nov 2008 – Dec 2009 Toyota Avensis
- Nov 2005 – Nov 2009 Toyota RAV4

On January 30, 2010, PSA Peugeot Citroën announced it was recalling cars built in a Czech Republic plant, Toyota Peugeot Citroën Automobile Czech, a joint venture with Toyota. Although the company did not say when it would begin the recall, nor how many cars were affected, the plant in question, which produces the Peugeot 107, Citroën C1 and the Toyota Aygo, produces 200,000 cars a year. On February 2, 2010, Toyota announced that the recalls could extend to Africa, Latin America, and the Middle East, where Toyota said it had sold a total of 180,000 vehicles, although the company did not specify how many might be affected by a recall. On February 3, 2010, Toyota Australia announced that its accelerator pedals are made by a different supplier and that there is no need for a recall of Australian-made vehicles.

=== History of accelerator pedal design ===
Automobile accelerator pedals have historically been mechanical assemblies that link the pedal to the engine throttle by mechanical linkages or a Bowden cable. With the advent of electronic throttle control, accelerator pedals consist of a spring-loaded pedal arm connected to an electronic transducer. This transducer, typically a potentiometer or Hall-effect sensor, converts the position of the pedal arm to an electronic signal which is sent to an electronic control unit (ECU).

The older mechanically designed accelerator pedals not only provided a spring return, but the mechanism inherently provided some friction. This friction introduced mechanical hysteresis into the pedal force versus pedal position transfer function. Put more simply, once the pedal was set at a specific position, the friction would help keep the pedal at this setting. This made it easier for the driver to maintain a pedal position. For example, if the driver's foot is slightly jostled by a bump in the road, the accelerator pedal tends to stay at its setting. While these old purely mechanical designs did have some friction, the return spring force was always designed to overcome this friction with a considerable safety margin. The return spring force ensured that the throttle returned to zero if the pedal force applied by the driver was reduced or removed.

With electronic accelerator pedals, there was little inherent friction because of the simplicity of the mechanical design. The tactile pedal response of only a spring force with no hysteresis can make it more difficult for a driver to maintain an accelerator pedal position. Manufacturers of electronic accelerator pedals designed their pedals with additional parts to recreate the tactile response of the older mechanical accelerator pedals. To quote from CTS Corporation's 2004 U.S. patent application:

...drivers generally prefer the feel, i.e., the tactile response, of conventional cable-driven throttle systems. Designers have therefore attempted to address this preference with mechanisms for emulating the tactile response of cable-driven accelerator pedals.

The Toyota electronic accelerator pedals contain a special friction device made of nylon 4/6 or polyphenylene sulfide within the pedal assembly to recreate the tactile response of older pedals. According to the Toyota recall information, it is this device that, in some instances, has been preventing the accelerator pedal from returning to zero. To quote from the Toyota recall FAQ:

The issue involves a friction device in the pedal designed to provide the proper "feel" by adding resistance and making the pedal steady and stable. This friction device includes a "shoe" that rubs against an adjoining surface during normal pedal operation. Due to the materials used, wear and environmental conditions, these surfaces may, over time, begin to stick and release instead of operating smoothly. In some cases, friction could increase to a point that the pedal is slow to return to the idle position or, in rare cases, the pedal sticks, leaving the throttle partially open.

According to Toyota, the tactile response friction device in the affected Toyota electronic accelerator pedals sometimes creates too much friction. This excess friction either slows the pedal return or completely stops it. In the worst case, once a pedal is pushed to a specific setting, it stays at the setting even if the driver removes their foot from the pedal. Early reports, in March 2007, involved the Tundra pickup truck, which used nylon 4/6 in the friction lever.

Some questions and confusion exist if the Toyota explanation fully accounts for all instances of unintended acceleration involving Toyota vehicles. CTS Corporation, the American manufacturer of the electronic accelerator pedals that Toyota claims are at fault, has announced that:

The problem of sudden unintended acceleration has been reported to have existed in some Lexus vehicles and Toyota vehicles going back to 1999, when CTS did not even make this product for any customer, CTS believes that the rare slow return pedal phenomenon, which may occur in extreme environmental conditions, should absolutely not be linked with any sudden unintended acceleration incidents. CTS is also not aware of any accidents and injuries caused by the rare slow return pedal condition, to the best of its knowledge. CTS wishes to clarify that it does not, and has never made, any accelerator pedals for Lexus vehicles and that CTS also has no accelerator pedals in Toyota vehicles prior to model year 2005.

In June 2010, Chrysler also recalled 35,000 Dodge and Jeep models for sticky accelerator pedals made by CTS Corporation. Chrysler stated that the CTS pedals have pivot bushings that may dislodge, causing the accelerator to become stuck or slow to return to idle.

=== Field workaround for sudden unintended acceleration ===
Different "workarounds", user actions that ameliorate or prevent a negative, previously unforeseen circumstance, have been suggested as temporary fixes:

- Putting the car's transmission in neutral during out-of-control acceleration disengages the gears;
- Turning the ignition to the ACC (accessory) position, which, while cutting power to the engine, will also disable the power steering and the brake assist.
- Turning the ignition key to the OFF position, which will also cut power, but may cause lockage of the steering wheels and will also disable the power steering and the brake assist.

On whether braking alone may fail to stop affected vehicles, a driver account in the Los Angeles Times claimed that the attempt to stop a 2005 Camry was unsuccessful with both the brake and emergency brake. However, tests of the Camry by Car and Driver in 2009, attempting to use the brakes to stop acceleration of a purposely stuck throttle at 70, 100 and 120 miles per hour (110, 160 and 190 km/h), found that the test driver was able to reduce speed to 10 mph (16 km/h) in all instances, and in the 70 and 100 mph (110 and 160 km/h) tests, stop the car completely. The Camry's braking distances with a purposely stuck accelerator were also shorter than that of the Ford Taurus' regular stopping distance. Car and Driver concluded that, based on their emergency stopping tests, the Camry's brakes could overcome the accelerator in all cases even without a brake override, and that stopping distances with a wide-open throttle were largely indiscernible from regular braking.

In 2010, Edmunds.com also tested the stopping distances of a Toyota Camry SE V6 with a purposely stuck wide-open throttle. Their tests found that the car's brakes could override a stuck accelerator and bring the car to a stop. Although the transmission downshifted and the engine continued to propel the car, the stopping distance compared "favorably to a normal panic stop on wet asphalt." Edmunds.com did note that switching to neutral was the best option, given that average drivers may not press the brakes as firmly, and lighter presses will simply wear the brakes down. The German Commission on Technical Compliance (TÜV) of Rheinland also tested the stopping distance of Toyota iQ, Aygo, Yaris, Auris, Verso, Avensis, and RAV4 models. With the accelerator purposely jammed to 80% of maximum speed, each vehicle was able to brake safely to a halt. The TÜV findings indicated that each model met the legal requirements for deceleration and stopping distances, and that all Toyota models tested had brakes that could override a stuck accelerator.

== Anti-lock brake software recall ==
On February 3, 2010, the NHTSA announced that it had received reports from 102 drivers of possible problems related to the braking system on the 2010 model year Toyota Prius, while an additional 14 such reports had been received in Japan. Three of these reports claimed that brake problems had led to the car crashing, with one accident in July 2009 occurring when a Prius crashed head-on into another car injuring two people. The Prius was not involved in Toyota's second recall, although it had been involved in the first recall involving floor mats. Toyota said that it was investigating the reports, and that it would be "premature to comment." On February 3, 2010, the Japanese Transport Ministry began investigating the redesigned Prius, and Toyota said that it was aware of 77 Prius brake complaints in Japan. On February 4, 2010, the NHTSA announced it had opened an investigation into the issues with the Prius's brakes, which Toyota said was caused by a software glitch. The company said it was looking into the best way to solve the problem. An internal NHTSA memo indicated that the issue was the "short delay" in regenerative braking when hitting a bump, resulting in increased stopping distance.

On February 6, 2010, Toyota said that it had fixed the braking problem on Prius models built since late January 2010 via a software update for the ABS to improve brake response. On the same day, a Japanese newspaper reported that Toyota had contacted dealers in Japan about their intent to recall all affected vehicles. While it was unclear if the same step would be taken elsewhere, American dealers had been told that Toyota was planning on repairing the vehicles. On February 8, Toyota announced a voluntary global recall of 2010 model year Prius models produced through late January 2010. The affected vehicles will receive a software update for the brakes and its ABS system. In total, Toyota recalled three hybrid vehicles to reprogram the anti-lock braking (ABS) software. In February 2010, a U.S. federal grand jury in New York began the process of determining if there is probable cause to charge Toyota criminally for the way it has handled the Prius' brake recall, and a civil class action lawsuit has been filed on behalf of 2010 Prius hybrid owners. A total of 133,000 Prius vehicles in the U.S. and 52,000 in Europe are to receive the same software update. Guardian.co.uk reports that this affects the third-generation Prius built before January 27, 2010.

=== Affected vehicles for anti-lock brake software recall ===
- Toyota Sai
- Toyota Prius (2010 model year)
- Lexus HS 250h (2010 model year)

== Other recalls ==
On February 8, 2009, Toyota announced a recall of approximately 7,300 early 2010 model year 4-cylinder Camrys due to the possibility of the power steering hose rubbing into the front brake line which may cause a brake fluid leak.

On February 3, 2010, Toyota recalled approximately 153,000 vehicles from model years 2005 to 2011 for failing to comply with requirements of FMVSS 110, "Tire Selection and Rims", due to missing load-carrying capacity labels.

On February 12, 2010, Toyota recalled approximately 8,000 2010 model year 4WD Tacoma trucks for potential front drive shaft issues. The recall involves inspecting a drive shaft component which if cracked will be replaced. The Tacoma pickups were built between mid-December 2009 and early February 2010. Most affected vehicles have not been sold.

Another recall for frame corrosion was confined to the following model(s): MY 2000–2003 Toyota Tundra. According to Toyota USA, frame corrosion could allow spare tires or the fuel tank to fall off the vehicle.

On July 7, 2010, Toyota recalled 270,000 Lexus and Crown vehicles worldwide for improperly manufactured valve springs. According to Toyota, the condition can cause rough idling and potential engine stalling.

On October 21, 2010, Toyota announced a recall of 1.53 million vehicles (740,000 in the U.S., 599,000 in Japan, and 191,000 in Europe and other markets) worldwide; the recall affected MY 2005 and 2006 Avalon, MY 2004 to 2006 Highlander (non-hybrid) and Lexus RX330 and MY 2006 Lexus GS300, IS250 and IS350; the models affected in Japan and elsewhere (except the U.S.) include MY 2002 to 2006 Toyota Crown, Crown Majesta, Harrier, Mark X, Alphard, Kluger, and Lexus GS350, IS250 and IS350. The recall concerns brake fluid leakage from the master cylinder (U.S. market and non-U.S. marketed Toyota Crown and Lexus GS350) and an electrical problem with the fuel pump, which would cause engine stalling (all markets except the U.S.).

On November 9, 2011, Toyota announced a recall of 550,000 vehicles (447,000 in the U.S., 38,000 in Japan, and 25,000 in Australia and New Zealand) worldwide; the recall affected MY 2004-2005 Camry, Highlander, Sienna, and Solara, MY 2004 Avalon, MY 2006 Highlander HV, MY 2004-2005 Lexus ES330, and RX330 and MY 2006 RX400h. The recall concerns a steering problem caused by the misalignment of the inner and outer rings of the crankshaft pulley, which could cause noise or the Check Engine light to illuminate; if this problem is not corrected, the power steering belt can fall off the pulley, which can cause a sudden loss of power assist.

On October 10, 2012, Toyota announced a recall of 7.43 million vehicles (2.47 million in the US, 460,000 in Japan, 1.39 million in Europe, and 3.11 million in other markets) worldwide. In the U.S. the recall affects MY 2005-2010 Yaris, Corolla, Matrix, Camry, RAV4, Highlander, Tundra, and Sequoia as well as Scion xB and xD. In Japan, the recall affects MY 2005-2010 Vitz, Belta, Ractis, Ist, and Corolla Rumion. In Europe, the recall affects MY 2005-2010 Yaris, Corolla, Auris, Camry, and RAV-4. Vehicles in overseas markets are also affected. The recall concerns a problem with the driver's side power window switch that "sticks" and could lead it to melt or catch fire. It is "not something that would cause any deadly accidents like the recall of 2009" and repairs include the application of a special fluorine grease to the switch.

On January 30, 2013, Toyota announced a recall of one million vehicles in the US. The recall affects 752,000 MY 2003-2004 Corolla and Corolla Matrix models. The recall concerns the airbag module, which can cause the airbag to inflate improperly. Toyota also announced a recall affecting 270,000 MY 2006-2012 Lexus IS models. This recall concerns loose nuts on the wiper blades, which can cause the wipers to fail, especially if there is a heavy buildup of snow.

On March 15, 2013, Toyota announced a recall of 209,000 vehicles in the US. The recall affects MY 2007-2013 FJ Cruiser models. The recall concerns the driver and front passenger seat belt retractors, which can come loose, especially if the rear doors are slammed repeatedly.

== Investigations ==
Numerous investigations have taken place, including those by the U.S. NHTSA and the Japanese transport ministry. The difficulty of investigations is compounded by the fact that driver error can be a possibility in certain cases. The Wall Street Journal reported, "Even when dealers and automakers suspect driver error, it is difficult for them to outright blame their customers for fear of alienating them or appearing insensitive", which USA Today also suggested. Questions about why cases are mainly in the U.S. have also been raised by international investigations; German publication Der Spiegel reported that similar accidents have rarely occurred outside North America, and although there have been some reports of stuck Toyota accelerator pedals in Germany, all drivers braked successfully without loss of life.

In another U.S. incident, on December 26, 2009, four people died in Southlake, Texas, a suburb of Dallas, when their 2008 Toyota Avalon sped off the road and through a fence, landing upside down in a pond. The car's floor mats were found in the trunk of the car, where owners had been advised to put them as part of the recall. According to the police report, the driver suffered from epilepsy, but investigators could not rule out either a vehicle defect or the possibility that the driver had suffered a seizure.

On Feb 17, 2010, U.S. safety regulators launched an investigation into Corolla steering complaints. Following the widespread media publicity of the recalls, several media publications suggested that investigations of subsequent reports would have considered the possibility of "copycat complaints" and hoaxes, with potential complainants seeking to capitalize on possible settlement money, or affected by the psychological bandwagon effect of the mass publicity.

On March 14, 2010, the Norwegian government considered whether to ban Prius cars from roads in Norway pending an investigation after a near-fatal incident involving a senior citizen. On March 29, after receipt of technical and other information, police indicted the driver involved in the Prius incident for making "a false emergency call to police".

The use of vehicle event data recorders and video surveillance also proved beneficial to investigators, with findings of driver error in a March 9, 2010 Prius alleged sudden acceleration crash, where a 56-year-old housekeeper claimed to have braked but was recorded pressing the wrong pedal, and also in a March 29, 2010 Camry alleged sudden acceleration crash, where a 76-year-old driver claimed to have braked, but was filmed not doing so until after impact.

=== NHTSA investigations ===
NHTSA data shows that there was an annual average of 26 abrupt acceleration reports in the 1999–2001 Toyota Camry and Lexus ES models. This number increased by more than 400% to a total of 132 annually in 2002–2004 models, which were designed with new electronic throttles. Toyota responded by stating,

Six times in the past six years NHTSA has undertaken an exhaustive review of allegations of unintended acceleration on Toyota and Lexus vehicles and six times the agency closed the investigation without finding any electronic engine control system malfunction to be the cause of unintended acceleration.

In 2004, the NHTSA launched a probe of throttle control systems on around 1 million Lexus and Toyota sedans. Upon that probe, Toyota urged the NHTSA to define the issues as quick bursts where the engine surged to "something less than a wide-open throttle." The company compared the complaints to previous sudden unintended acceleration cases the NHTSA deemed "driver error." It also said the computer could not open the throttle without the accelerator pedal pressed, and, the brakes would be able to stop the car anyway.

After several months of investigating, the NHTSA said it found no evidence of a defect and no data was indicating any bad parts. Christopher Santucci, an employee of Toyota's Washington, D.C. office and an NHTSA employee until he was hired by Toyota in 2003, testified that he was informed by the NHTSA in March 2004 about the pending investigation over unintended acceleration complaints. According to Santucci in his deposition, his former NHTSA colleagues decided not to investigate some incidents involving acceleration lasting longer than 1 second. The decision to exclude certain incidents from the investigation reduced the significance of the issue to the NHTSA at least on paper. However, in 2005, 2006 and 2008, Toyota customers again asked the NHTSA to investigate uncontrolled acceleration from electronic throttle controls and power steering issues. Although there were hundreds of complaints, the NHTSA found no evidence of defects; and in every case, Toyota provided data it said showed no such evidence.

On November 2, 2009, the NHTSA denied a petition to reopen previously closed unintended investigations of Toyota vehicles, stating they were unlikely to reach any new conclusions. In February 2010, however, NHTSA was again looking into the electronic throttle control systems on Toyota vehicles. In February 2010, State Farm insurance revealed that it had warned NHTSA in late 2007 on an increased trend of Toyota accidents related to the recalled models; other insurers stated however that they had not seen such a trend. On June 1, 2010, the NHTSA opened an investigation into reports that floor mats were jamming accelerators in Ford Fusion and Mercury Milan sedans. On June 30, 2010, NHTSA reported on its latest broad study of unintended acceleration on all car makes, including Toyota, in conjunction with NASA and the National Academy of Sciences. NHTSA stated that it was unable to find electronic throttle defects, but identified floor mat entrapment and pedals that were slow to return to idle as two causes of Toyota complaints. NHTSA also stated it could only verify one Toyota unintended acceleration accident caused by a vehicle defect. On July 14, 2010, The Wall Street Journal reported that NHTSA investigations of 75 accidents alleged to sudden acceleration in Toyota vehicles had found driver error as the primary cause in all but one case attributed to floor mats. Black box recorder data found that during these crashes, the throttle was open and brakes not pressed. On July 30, The Wall Street Journal quoted the former head of NHTSA's Recall Management Division stating that the investigation "has become very political", with Department of Transportation officials "hoping against hope that they find something that points back to a flaw". Although the NHTSA study finding driver error was reportedly complete, DOT officials had blocked its release.

On February 8, 2011, NASA and the NHTSA announced the findings of a ten-month study concerning the causes of the Toyota malfunctions of 2009. According to their findings, there were no electronic faults in the cars that could have caused the sudden-acceleration problems. "The jury is back, the verdict is in: There is no electronic-based cause for unintended high-speed acceleration in Toyotas, period," Transportation Department Secretary Ray LaHood declared in the LA Times.

=== MLIT investigations ===
Hiroko Tabuchi, writing in The New York Times, claims that problematic vehicles may have been accurately reported in Japan due to police correctly blaming driver error, as no verified unintended acceleration case exists. The Japanese Ministry of Land, Infrastructure, Transport and Tourism (MLIT) released its findings of sudden acceleration complaints in February 2010, finding that of the 134 cases logged by the ministry between 2007 and 2009, Toyota accounted for 38 cases (28.3% of all reported). Because Toyota's market share was approximately 27.8% of all passenger cargo vehicles, the MLIT noted that no particularly unusual rate was found among these complaints.

=== US congressional hearings ===
The House Oversight and Government Reform Committee and the House Energy and Commerce Committee held hearings in February 2010. Retired social worker Rhonda Smith testified before Congress that her car accelerated out of control but the NHTSA investigator determined that a misplaced floor mat had caused the problem; the subsequent owner of the car reported no trouble after driving the car over 27,000 miles.

In a February 2010 letter to Toyota, U.S. congressional investigators "said a review of consumer complaints produced by Toyota shows that company personnel identified sticking pedals or floor mats as the cause of only 16 percent of the unintended acceleration reports". Several media reports later claimed that Toyota had announced that the recalls will not completely solve the accelerator pedal problems. On February 24, 2010, Toyota responded that it "has rigorously tested its solutions" and is "confident" with the recall repairs, but that it would continue to monitor other possible contributing factors for unintended acceleration, including mechanical, electronics, and driver error. Akio Toyoda, the president and CEO of Toyota, issued the following statement in regards to the recalled vehicles:

Toyota has, for the past few years, been expanding its business rapidly. Quite frankly, I fear the pace at which we have grown may have been too quick. I would like to point out here that Toyota's priority has traditionally been the following: First; Safety, Second; Quality, and Third; Volume. These priorities became confused, and we were not able to stop, think, and make improvements as much as we were able to before, and our basic stance to listen to customers' voices to make better products has weakened somewhat. We pursued growth over the speed at which we were able to develop our people and our organization, and we should sincerely be mindful of that. I regret that this has resulted in the safety issues described in the recalls we face today, and I am deeply sorry for any accidents that Toyota drivers have experienced. Especially, I would like to extend my condolences to the members of the Saylor family, for the accident in San Diego. I would like to send my prayers again, and I will do everything in my power to ensure that such a tragedy never happens again.

In early 2010, the U.S. government began considering requiring all vehicles sold in the U.S. to have accelerator override built into their brake systems.

Research groups have questioned whether Toyota would "get off easily" because of its large investment in lobbying in Washington, with close ties to the congressional representatives who will lead inquiries into the company's string of safety problems. Other publications noted that half the Democratic congressional members involved in the hearings had received campaign contributions from the United Auto Workers union, a major stockholder of Toyota's top U.S. rival, General Motors.

==== US governors' letter to congressional members ====
On February 10, 2010, four bipartisan U.S. governors from the states of Kentucky, Indiana, Mississippi, and Alabama where Toyota operates plants wrote a letter to Congress commenting about "the federal government's obvious conflict of interest because of its huge financial stake in some of its competitors," referring to Toyota as a "victim" of the media's "aggressive and questionable news coverage". The letter also noted there were "16.4 million recalls in the auto industry for 2009", "many as serious or more serious" than Toyota's recall.

== Aftermath ==
Toyota stopped producing vehicles on certain production lines for the week of February 1, 2010, to assess and coordinate activities. The North America vehicle production facilities affected were located in Cambridge and Woodstock, Ontario, Canada (where Corolla, Matrix, and RAV4 models are produced), Princeton, Indiana (Highlander and Sequoia), Georgetown, Kentucky (Avalon and Camry), and San Antonio, Texas (Tundra). In addition to recalling vehicles, Toyota announced that it would install brake override systems on all Lexus, Scion and Toyota vehicles by the end of 2010.

On February 3, 2010, United States Transportation Secretary Ray LaHood advised owners of vehicles affected by the recall to "stop driving" their vehicles until they can be fixed by a dealer. LaHood later retracted his statement, stating it was "obviously, a misstatement." Secretary La Hood was criticized for making that statement by some media columnists, who suspected La Hood of having a conflict-of-interest due to the U.S. government's auto bailout partial ownership of Toyota's domestic rivals, General Motors and Chrysler.

=== Economic impact ===
The recall came at a difficult time for Toyota, as it was struggling to emerge from the recession and had already suffered from a resultant decrease in sales, and the low exchange rate from yen to US dollars. On the day the recall was announced in the US, it was also announced that 750 jobs would be cut at Toyota's British plant at Burnaston, near Derby. Also, it was estimated that each Toyota dealership in the U.S. could lose between US$1.75 million to US$2 million a month in revenue, a total loss of US$2,470 million across the country from the entire incident. Additionally, Toyota Motors as a whole announced that it could face losses totaling as much as US$2,000 million from lost output and sales worldwide. Between 25 January and 29 January 2010 Toyota shares fell in value by 15%.

According to analysts, Toyota owners (including owners of cars not recalled) may also be economically affected by the recall, as the damage to Toyota's reputation could negatively affect the resale value of used cars.

=== Manufacturer changes ===
In addition to its recall efforts, a new global quality committee to coordinate defect analysis and future recall announcements was announced by Toyota in early 2010, along with a Swift Market Analysis Response Team ("SMART") in the U.S. to conduct on-site vehicle inspections, expanded Event Data Recorder usage and readers, third-party quality consultation, and increased driver safety education initiatives. Industry analysts noted that the recall response was a challenge for The Toyota Way manufacturing philosophy, because the recalled parts were not due to factory errors or quality control problems, but rather to design issues leading to consumer complaints. As a result, better communication of consumer issues with management was needed, and so the global quality committee aimed to be more responsive to consumer concerns.

=== Competitor reactions ===
One day after Toyota's announced sales suspension General Motors began offering a US$1,000 cash rebate targeted toward Toyota owners. By February 1, 2010 Ford, Chrysler, and Hyundai were offering similar incentives.

=== Release of Toyota driver jailed for fatal crash ===
In February 2010, a motion for retrial was submitted on behalf of a Minnesota man, Koua Fong Lee, who, in 2008, was sentenced to eight years in jail for rear-ending a car, killing three of the five occupants and injuring the other two. This happened in June 2006 when he was driving home from church with his family and exiting the highway. Koua insists that his 1996 Toyota Camry sped up to between 70 and 90 mph (110 and 140 km/h) despite heavy braking. In May 2010, a vehicle inspector hired by attorneys for the convicted man reported finding problems with the car's accelerator system.

At least two of the jurors from the 2008 trial questioned the guilty verdict, and one of the injured survivors filed suit against Toyota and the local dealership that sold the car, stating that he believed Lee should be set free. In June 2010, the Ramsey County Attorney and prosecutor Susan Gaertner opposed a new trial, stating that she saw no evidence that Koua's Camry experienced "sudden unintended acceleration", and a U.S. District Court Judge was given until September 2010 to decide whether or not Lee should be re-tried. In August 2010, the judge ruled that Lee would be re-tried, but the prosecutor declined to prosecute. Before the ruling, Gaertner offered Lee release with the condition that he would still have a felony conviction on his record, barring him from driving privileges for ten years, and that he would be jailed if arrested for anything else. Lee did not agree to such conditions. Later that month, a Minnesota judge freed Lee from prison and Gaertner said she would immediately drop the charges.

=== Media coverage and criticism ===
According to news analysis by the Project for Excellence in Journalism, which analyzed weekly output from newspapers (The New York Times, The Washington Post, USA Today, and others) as well as network television (ABC, CBS, NBC, and others), the Toyota recalls were the #5 most reported story on U.S. news for the week of January 25–31, 2010, at 4% of all coverage. The following week of February 1–7, 2010, the story reached #2, at 11% of all news coverage. On February 10, Toyota dealers in the five-state Southeast region pulled all advertising from ABC stations in protest of "excessive" reporting on the Toyota recalls. On March 5, the Associated Press described "relentless media coverage" of the recalls from news outlets.

During the height of the recall crisis, Toyota came in for extensive criticism. Editorials criticizing alleged disproportionate coverage of the recalls ran in Automotive News, AutoWeek, BusinessWeek, Car and Driver, Motor Trend, Popular Mechanics, and the National Post. Such editorials commonly faulted media outlets for leaving out alternative explanations such as driver inattentiveness, driver skills, DUI, being on the cellphone, erroneous perceptions, reckless driving, or texting as causes of accidents. In one cited example, the Los Angeles Times did not mention that an alleged Toyota runaway driver was indicted for vehicular manslaughter and driving under the influence of marijuana.

Odds from Car and Driver indicated that the alleged fatality risk was about 1 in 200,000 recalled Toyota vehicles, versus a 1 in 8,000 risk of a fatal car accident in any car in the U.S., while Consumer Reports stated a 1 in 10,000 chance of an unintended acceleration complaint out of 20 million Toyotas on the road.

==== James Sikes alleged unintended acceleration case ====
On March 8, 2010, a 2008 Prius allegedly uncontrollably accelerated to 94 miles per hour on a California Highway (US), and the Prius had to be stopped with the verbal assistance of the California Highway Patrol as news cameras watched. The incident received national news coverage, with initial reporting including inaccurate information about the event, such as the claim that a CHP car was used to physically block Sikes' vehicle. Subsequent investigations uncovered suspicious information about the alleged runaway Prius driver, 61-year-old James Sikes, including being US$19,000 behind in his Prius car payments and with US$700,000 in accumulated debt. Sikes stated he wanted a new car as compensation for the incident. Analyses by Edmunds.com and Forbes found Sikes' acceleration claims and fears of shifting to neutral implausible, with Edmunds concluding that "in other words, this is BS", and Michael Fumento in Forbes analyzing Sikes's claims related to the mechanics of his Prius and his contradictions, such as saying he didn't want to take his hands off the steering wheel to shift into neutral even though he held a cell phone in his hand almost the entire time, comparing it to the balloon boy hoax. Further government investigator tests on Sikes's Prius reportedly showed that the brake wear were consistent with intermittent braking, not constant hard braking as he claimed. Sikes also reportedly had a history of false police reports, suspect insurance claims, theft and fraud allegations, and television aspirations. These findings raised questions about "the credibility of Mr. Sikes' reporting of events" in a Congressional memo.

=== Public image ===
According to a Rasmussen poll released on February 8, 2010, Toyota was viewed favorably by 59% and unfavorably by 29%. The poll also found 72% of Americans have followed the recent Toyota news stories "somewhat closely" and 31% "very closely". A second Rasmussen poll released on February 12 found 23% of Americans believe the federal government is criticizing Toyota to aid General Motors of which it is the majority owner, 38% disagreed, and 39% were unsure.

== Other possible causes of unintended acceleration ==
=== Electronic throttle control system ===
On November 25, 2009, ABC News quoted Sean Kane, head of the for-profit firm Safety Research & Strategies, stating that he had uncovered hundreds of "non-floor mat sudden acceleration cases" which the floor mat recall did not address. Kane, who works with attorneys suing Toyota, said his firm had discovered over 2,000 Toyota sudden acceleration cases involving 16 deaths and 243 injuries, publishing its most comprehensive report on the issue on Feb 5th, 2010. Kane alleged that the problem was not with the accelerator pedals, but with the electronic throttle control systems (ETC). An electronic throttle control system is a drive-by-wire system, in which the accelerator pedal and the engine are indirectly linked electronically, instead of directly linked mechanically. This means that input from the accelerator pedal is just one input used to decide how wide the throttle is opened. On Feb 13, 2010, The Wall Street Journal reported that Kane's company was "controversial" because its income comes from lawsuits against auto manufacturers, which was not disclosed in media reports; auto journalists noted that the firm had a "vested interest" in blaming manufacturer defects while avoiding operator error. The Los Angeles Times reported that since Toyota and Lexus began installing electronic throttle control systems in 2001, complaints of unintended acceleration with vehicles from both those brands rose sharply. Electromagnetic interference with the electronic throttle control system is another possible cause of unintended acceleration. Some speculated that cosmic rays, or radiation from outer space, was a possible source for alleged electronic malfunctions.

The Wall Street Journal obtained a copy of a preliminary study dated on February 4, 2010 by the California-based engineering research firm Exponent. The initial study commissioned by Toyota beginning in December 2009 concluded "Exponent has so far been unable to induce, through electrical disturbances to the system, either unintended acceleration or behavior that might be a precursor to such an event, despite concerted efforts toward this goal." For the study Exponent purchased six Toyota and Lexus vehicles which were analyzed by "engineers and technicians specializing in mechanical, electrical, and automotive engineering." According to Exponent, Toyota "didn't limit the scope or budget of its investigation" which is being shared with Toyota and lawmakers. The study will continue for several more months. According to the Los Angeles Times, Exponent's research has been criticized as being relied upon by companies in need of public defense, although the firm has defended its impartiality towards clients ranging from firms to the U.S. government. A University of California cardiologist was quoted saying, "I would have picked a firm with more of a reputation of neutrality" citing as an example their determination that secondhand smoke isn't carcinogenic. Toyota subsequently asked Stanford University's Center for Automotive Research, a facility partly funded by multiple automakers including Toyota, to also evaluate the electronics claims. The center's J. Christian Gerdes, professor of mechanical engineering, rejected several electronics claims as implausible, and said that his findings were independent and that he received no compensation from Toyota for his evaluation.

On Feb. 8, 2010, the NHTSA and NASA concluded the electronics were not to blame after reviewing the electronics and electromagnetic interference. The finding was based on studying over 280,000 lines of software coding on nine vehicles involved in earlier sudden acceleration incidents. And studying the throttle systems at NASA's Langley Research Center and Chrysler's Auburn Hills headquarters.

In January 2021, engineer Colin O'Flynn was able to induce unintended acceleration with components from a Toyota vehicle using electromagnetic fault injection (EMFI) on a test bench. He used an ECU and components from a wrecked 2005 Toyota Corolla. O'Flynn's experiments were conducted without access to the ECU source code, and without access to the confidential report by the Barr Group.

==== ABC News acceleration controversy ====
On February 22, 2010, ABC News broadcast a report which demonstrated how unintended acceleration could be caused by inducing a short circuit in the throttle control. In the segment, David W. Gilbert, a professor of automotive technology at Southern Illinois University Carbondale, was shown in a late-model Avalon with ABC News reporter Brian Ross. By "inducing a short" in an unspecified circuit, Gilbert was able to cause the Avalon to accelerate dramatically. After the car was stopped, a diagnostic tool connected to the car's ECU displayed no fault code. According to Dr. Gilbert, the proper design of the ETC should not have permitted a short like the one he induced to open the throttle; the ECU should have detected a fault and cut the throttle. Tests on GM vehicles, Gilbert said, did not expose a similar flaw. Autoblog's analysis queried the test's real-world accuracy, noting that the short circuit method was not disclosed outside of wiring normally independent sensors together, the ECU could not be expected to detect unrealistic scenarios, and questioning ABC News' and Brian Ross's objectivity. Autoblog also uncovered that Gilbert was being paid by parties in lawsuits against Toyota. Automotive analyst John McElroy on Autoline Detroit pointed to network news' history of "rigged" car demonstrations, including the 60 Minutes acceleration demo and the Dateline NBC exploding truck scandal, and noted that ABC News' report did not include opposing views or disclose interviewee's financial ties. Toyota responded by inviting ABC News to be present at its evaluation of the test.

On March 8, 2010, Toyota held a live news conference where its engineers demonstrated the same short circuit method on Ford, Chevrolet, Chrysler, and BMW vehicles. In each case, engineers were able to induce the same dramatic acceleration with no ECU fault code. Stanford's Center for Automotive Research stated that ABC News' demo was unrealistic and misleading. A study by Exponent Inc. finding that the short circuit "would be highly unlikely to occur naturally" and could "only be contrived in the laboratory" was also issued. Toyota further demonstrated how Gilbert had allegedly shaved away wiring insulation, cut wires in the ETC, re-spliced them in a particular sequence, and added a control switch. Gilbert's financial motive, being paid by Sean Kane, was also questioned. AutoWeek, Edmunds.com, and other automotive sources saw the conference as debunking ABC News' claims. On March 11, 2010, ABC News further admitted to faking part of its report after tachometer screenshots were posted online. The freeze-frames showed the parking brake, open-door, and seat belt warning lights on while the car was allegedly "accelerating" to 6,000 RPM, indicating that the car was actually not moving. Media blog Gawker.com posted the photos and stated, "the tachometer footage is faked". ABC News claimed that it was "impossible to get a good picture of the tachometer" during the actual test, and re-edited the footage. Gawker.com responded that the edited video was even more "staged". The Associated Press added that the falsified footage "created ethical questions".

==== Possible cruise control cause ====
In February 2010, multiple media reports claimed that Apple Inc. co-founder Steve Wozniak had suggested that faulty software may be part of the problem. However, in a subsequent CNN interview, Wozniak stated, "I haven't really said those things. They have put those words in my mouth". Instead, Wozniak said his comments were about a "minor" cruise control issue on one of his several Priuses, and regarding other recalls, "whether it was mats, whether it was a sticky accelerator pedal, whatever – I believe they found the right solution. If Toyota says it's not electrical, then I'm sure they're right." When asked to describe his cruise control problem, Wozniak said, "It's a little more of a procedure of upping the speed, upping the speed, and then suddenly it just sort of went like it thought you told it to go to infinity." As for alternative explanations, Wozniak said "If you're panicked and your car takes off, you don't think of these things." He also clarified that his comments were "to a group of teachers for a discovery museum and talking about an issue of customer support, how hard it is sometimes to get to the people that can really deal with your problems". Automotive journalist John Voelcker's analysis of Wozniak's description blamed the issue on user error, and not being familiar with the design differences of the adaptive cruise control system. In the Prius, unlike some other cars, holding down the accelerate button increases speed in 5 mph increments continuously; Voelcker suggested Wozniak was holding down the button for longer than necessary, setting the cruise to a high set speed, thus resulting in the "smooth" acceleration to high speed he experienced. Some Prius users have also suggested erroneous user input explanations. Others have come forward with their own stories about erratic vehicle behavior while using their cruise control. In March 2010, Ward's Auto reported that user unfamiliarity with the faster response of laser- and radar-based cruise control systems was a likely factor according to AAA, NHTSA, and manufacturer findings.

=== Driver error ===
The Wall Street Journal reported on February 25, 2010, that "safety regulators, human-error experts, and auto makers say driver error is the primary cause of sudden acceleration." Regarding the 2009-10 Toyota recalls, Ward's Auto noted that NHTSA investigations over past years have found that the majority of sudden unintended acceleration cases are due to driver error. In such cases, accidents are the result of drivers mistakenly stepping on the accelerator pedal instead of the brake. On November 29, 2009, the Los Angeles Times quoted a motor skills consultant stating that the fault in sudden acceleration cases "almost always lies with drivers who step on the wrong pedal." In February 2010, Car and Driver suggested that the alleged accident rate of 1 in 200,000 recalled Toyotas was "highly unlikely" to result from vehicle defects, pointing to an increased danger for drivers who "aren't smart or calm enough to shift to neutral". The same month, Forbes referred to auto industry experts as "skeptical" of defect explanations, suggesting that "driver error and panic account for many reported problems" with recalled Toyotas. On February 4, Leonard Evans, author of Traffic Safety, claimed that driver behavior was the main factor in Toyota accidents, and that the consensus of 70 years of scientific research is that driver error is the prominent explanation for automotive fatalities. In March 2010, Forbes Michael Fumento, The Atlantic's Megan McArdle and attorney Ted Frank argued that the fact that most of the incidents of sudden acceleration in Toyota occur in elderly drivers strongly suggest that there is not an electronics problem as opposed to one of pedal misapplication. Fumento's article was titled: "Why Do Toyotas Hate the Elderly?", and McArdle noted that immigrants were also twice as likely to be involved. However, lawsuits filed regarding sudden unintended acceleration cases, along with related third-party investigation reports, have typically avoided the driver error explanation.

In August 2010, The Wall Street Journal reported that experts at the National Highway Traffic Safety Administration had examined the "black boxes" of 58 vehicles involved in sudden-acceleration reports. The study found that in 35 of the cases, the brakes weren't applied at the time of the crash. In nine other cases in the same study, the brakes were used only at the last moment before impact.

==== Factors leading to pedal misapplication ====
On March 10, 2010, The New York Times ran an opinion piece by Richard Schmidt, professor emeritus of psychology at University of California Los Angeles and sudden acceleration researcher, suspecting driver error as the primary cause of unexplained Toyota sudden acceleration reports. Schmidt pointed to several factors that make driver error more likely: elderly driver age, lack of experience with the car, and short stature. In addition, unexplained sudden acceleration events were most frequently reported as occurring at low speed or fully stopped. Typically, the driver intended to press the brake, and did not consciously confuse the pedals; however, because of advanced age and neuromuscular irregularities, short stature and difficulty reaching the pedals, a slight misalignment in seating position, or unfamiliarity with the car model, the driver's foot contacted the accelerator by mistake. The resulting unexpected sudden acceleration would lead to panic, with the driver thinking that the acceleration system had failed. The immediate response would be to brake hard, but not knowing that their foot was on the accelerator, pressing down caused greater acceleration. In such panic situations, the driver would think that the brakes were not responding, and continue pressing on the accelerator pedal until they crashed. Switching to neutral or turning off the ignition was typically not contemplated. Incidents occurred exclusively in automatic transmission-equipped cars with driver complaints involving rental cars being far more frequent. All factors point to reduced driver familiarity and sophistication.

On March 12, 2010, Autoline Detroit argued that searches for additional vehicle defects were likely fruitless, as driver error was the primary cause of the 0.009 per million rate of Toyota sudden acceleration incidents from 1999 to 2009, with "demographics and psychographics", namely elderly drivers and pedal misapplication as factors. Also noted was that drivers with Type II diabetes (adult onset), which is more common among the elderly, are subject to reduced sensation in their lower extremities (peripheral neuropathy) with related impairment in positional knowledge of foot placement (proprioception). Wired wrote that since investigators have been "unable to find evidence supporting drivers' claims their Toyotas suddenly raced out of control" operator error is the most likely explanation. However, victims and relatives of sudden acceleration cases are commonly unwilling to suspect involved loved ones, and blame the vehicle instead. Analysis of alleged Toyota acceleration reports in The Atlantic and other sources have found the highest distribution of involved drivers between 70 and 80 years old, with the average age skewing over 55; with elderly susceptibility to "neuronal misfiring" and pedal misapplication as a possible cause. While many alleged cases lack exact details, over half of the reported incidents occurred from a complete stop or low speed, providing a window for the pedal misapplication to occur. A prior GM study found that 60- and 70-year-olds were six times more likely to experience sudden acceleration than 20- to 30-year-olds. In The New York Times, Richard Schmidt concluded that a brake override system could prevent acceleration cases where a vehicle defect existed, but would not prevent sudden acceleration cases caused by pedal misapplication.

==== Previous findings of driver error ====
Car and Driver, Motor Trend, and Ward's Auto also compared the 2009-10 Toyota recalls to the Audi sudden acceleration cases of the 1980s, which led to a widely noted media frenzy and hundreds of sudden unintended acceleration claims for Audi cars. In that case, a 1986 segment on CBS News' 60 Minutes accused the Audi 5000 sedan of unintended acceleration defects, which was followed by numerous reports of tragic accidents and media expert commentary. At the time, Audi was reported to have the highest rate of acceleration complaints. However, the NHTSA later determined all complaints to be due to driver error.

The Detroit News documented previous sudden unintended acceleration cases dating back to August 1978 when the NHTSA opened an investigation into General Motors for sudden acceleration, concluding eight years later driver error was the likely culprit. By 1986, more than 2,000 injuries had been blamed on sudden acceleration with sudden acceleration complaints totaling over 10 percent of complaints filed to the NHTSA. In 1986 the NHTSA launched an investigation of the 1981-84 Toyota Cressida and an additional five other automakers. By 1989 the NHTSA determined driver error was "the most probable explanation" for the complaints.

==== NHTSA and NASA Investigation Verdict ====
In February 2011, the findings of a 10-month-long study conducted by the National Highway Traffic Safety Administration (NHTSA) and the National Aeronautics and Space Administration (NASA), aimed to identify the main cause of sudden acceleration in Toyota and Lexus models. The study was requested by the U.S. Congress and "enlisted NASA engineers with expertise in areas such as computer-controlled electronic systems, electromagnetic interference, and software integrity". The most common problem was drivers hitting the accelerator pedal when they thought they were hitting the brake, which the NHTSA called "pedal misapplication." Of the 58 cases reported, 18 were dismissed out of hand. Of the remaining 40, 39 of them were found to have no cause; the remainder being an instance of "pedal entrapment." One investigator says most of the cases involved "pedal misapplication" – that is, "the driver stepped on the gas rather than the brake or in addition to the brake." The report concluded that the two mechanical safety defects that were originally identified by NHTSA are known causes of dangerous unintended acceleration.

== Litigation ==
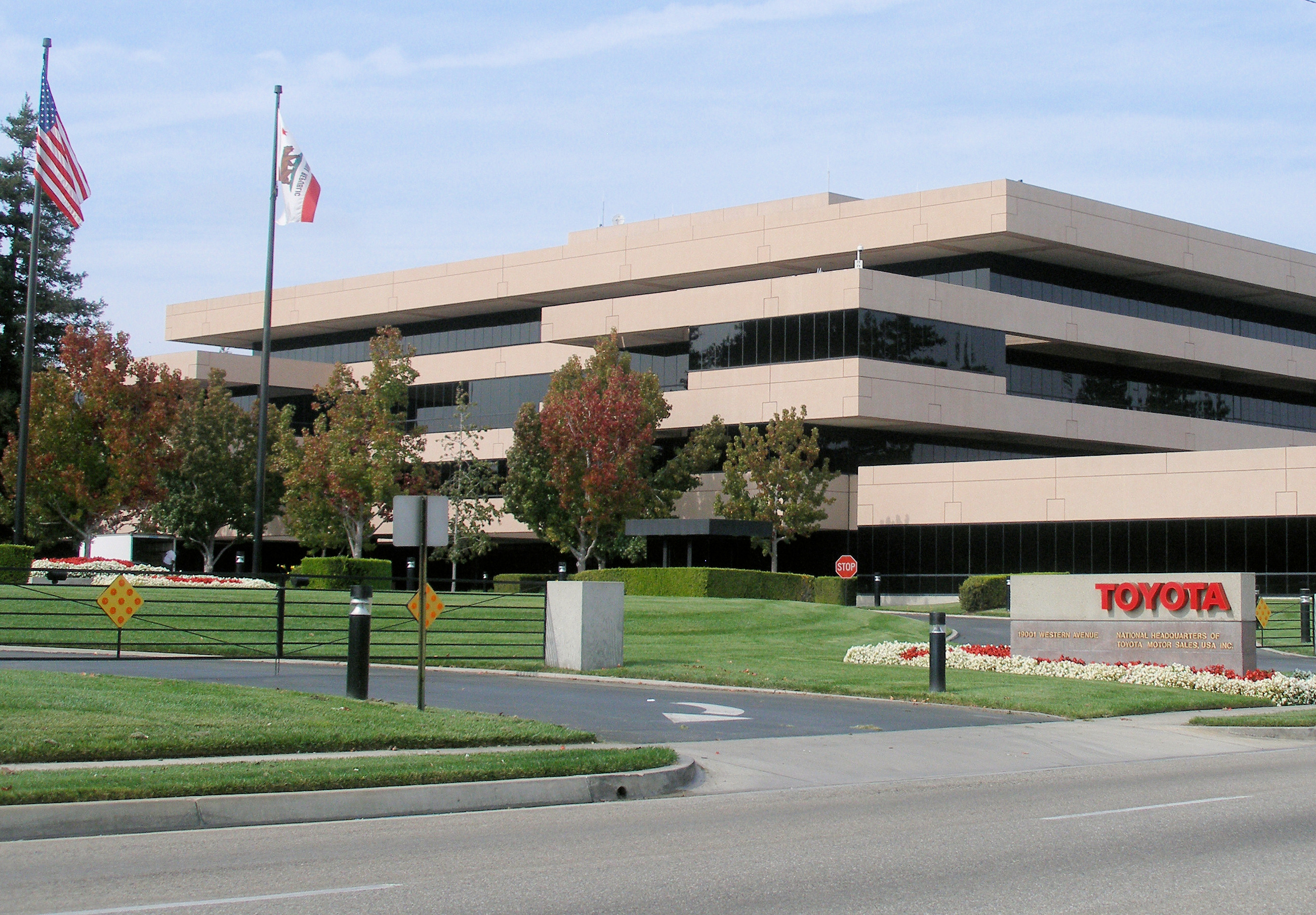
Toyota Motor Sales, U.S.A., Inc. headquarters in Torrance (within the Central District of California)

Consumers in the U.S. and Canada have filed numerous class action lawsuits blaming the sudden acceleration problem on the electronic throttle control system (ETC) and alleging Toyota's negligence. As of February 26, 2010, there were at least 72 lawsuits pending in U.S. federal courts against Toyota or its subsidiaries as a result of the 2009-10 recalls. Plaintiffs are seeking damages for personal injury or wrongful death resulting from accidents in the defective Toyota vehicles (in other words, product liability), loss of resale value, or a drop in the value of shares held by Toyota shareholders. Toyota has retained the law firm of Alston & Bird to defend most of these cases.

On April 9, 2010, the U.S. Judicial Panel on Multidistrict Litigation ordered consolidation of all federal actions into the Central District of California before Judge James V. Selna for all pretrial motions and discovery. In doing so, the Panel noted that "these cases have attracted an unusual amount of publicity to the Panel's work." Although only 11 cases were directly before the JPML, it also noted that the parties had notified it of more than 100 potentially related cases, which can also be consolidated as so-called "tag-along" cases. As to why Judge Selna, the Panel explained, "Judge Selna's 28 years of private law practice at the very highest levels and in some of the most complex cases leaves him well prepared for a case of this magnitude." Under federal multidistrict litigation law, any cases that are not dismissed or settled during the consolidated pretrial process will be remanded to their original district court for trial.

The following week, Judge Selna set a May 13 initial scheduling conference at his courtroom in Santa Ana, California. He also appointed Cari Dawson, chairwoman of Alston & Bird's class action department, as lead counsel for defendants.

On May 14, after reviewing submissions from dozens of plaintiffs' attorneys, Judge Selna issued an order establishing which attorneys would be granted the potentially lucrative positions of lead counsel for the plaintiffs. First, he named nine attorneys as lead counsel for the economic loss cases and nine attorneys as lead counsel for the personal injury and wrongful death cases. He then named nine of the attorneys from these two panels to form a core discovery committee. Three additional attorneys were named as liaisons to coordinate discovery with pending state court actions and other related federal litigation in progress outside of the MDL, like shareholder litigation. Finally, one additional attorney was named as a consultant on behalf of international Toyota consumers. Prominent attorneys appointed on the plaintiffs' side included Steve Berman of Hagens Berman Sobol Shapiro (on the personal injury and wrongful death committee) and Elizabeth Cabraser of Lieff Cabraser (on the economic loss committee).

Selna also clarified the roles of defense counsel by appointing Cari Dawson and Lisa Gilford of Alston & Bird as lead counsel in the economic loss cases and Vince Galvin and Joel Smith of Bowman and Brooke as lead counsel in the personal injury and wrongful death cases. Gilford and Galvin were also appointed to serve as lead defense liaisons to other related cases in federal and state courts.

On June 1, 2010, Judge Selna issued another order setting out a discovery schedule. He ordered both sides to make initial discovery disclosures by July 2, 2010, and set out a briefing schedule for motions concerning the consolidated complaints, with oral arguments set for November 19, 2010. In a separate order on that same date, he also ordered that all motion-related documents filed by any attorney would now have to be co-signed by lead counsel for that attorney's side, and that lead counsel were to act as gatekeepers, to cut down on the number of documents being filed with the court. On July 1, 2010, Judge Selna appointed two retired Presiding Justices of the California Court of Appeal as special masters: John K. Trotter and Steven Stone.

On June 10, 2011, after the parties had completed some discovery, Judge Selna issued an order setting trial dates of February 19, 2013, and May 21, 2013, for the first two "bellwether" trials, and designated a Utah wrongful death/personal injury case as the first one (of 300 in progress) to go to trial.

Toyota has also been sued for not having a brake override system on older models. Attorney Robert Nelson, representing Jacquelyn Donoghue of Holder, Nebraska, the 67-year-old widow of a man killed in an accident in which her model year 2006 Prius allegedly suddenly accelerated into another vehicle, killing the man and seriously injuring her, alleged that Toyota's failure to include a brake override on their models played a "direct role" in the death of John Donoghue. Edgar Heiskell, an attorney involved with one of the lawsuits, contends that electromagnetic interference with the electronic throttle control system is to blame for acceleration cases. Heiskell contends that Toyota models as old as 2002 are also affected. According to him, "Toyota can't tell you that the '07 Camry they are recalling is any different from the '06 or the '03 that has the same throttle control in it." According to The Wall Street Journal's Holman W. Jenkins, Jr., "trial lawyers love the electronic gremlin theory because it's impossible to disprove in any individual case."

On December 26, 2012, Toyota announced it would spend more than US$1 billion to settle a class action lawsuit involving unintended acceleration by retrofitting vehicles with safety devices and compensated owners for lost resale value. A confidential settlement was reached in a lawsuit against Toyota involving the injury of Jean Bookout and the death of Barbara Schwarz in November 2013.

=== Settlement with the U.S. government ===
On March 19, 2014, it was announced that Toyota and the U.S. Justice Department had reached an agreement whereby Toyota would pay a US$1.2 billion criminal penalty in exchange for deferred prosecution of wire fraud charges. The agreement also subjects the car company to further independent monitoring of its safety procedures. The penalty ended a four-year investigation in which the Justice Department concluded that Toyota had intentionally hidden information about safety defects from the public and had made deceptive statements to protect its brand image. Attorney General Eric H. Holder Jr. remarked "Other car companies should not repeat Toyota's mistake. A recall may damage a company's reputation, but deceiving your customers makes that damage far more lasting." The penalty is the largest ever waged against a car company.

In a statement, Toyota called the agreement difficult, but "a major step toward putting this unfortunate chapter behind us". The company said it has made fundamental changes in its corporate structure and safety procedures since the investigation started. Brake-override systems are now standard on all Toyota vehicles.

As of March 2014, several civil wrongful death and personal injury lawsuits were pending.

== Other manufacturers ==
The number of NHTSA consumer complaints of unintended acceleration per 100,000 vehicles sold in the U.S. for the 1999–2009 model years.

Consumer complaints, unintended acceleration per 100,000 vehicles sold, 2008 MY

Consumer complaints, unintended acceleration per 312,000 vehicles sold, 2008 MY.

Toyota is not the only automobile manufacturer that has issued recalls for unintended acceleration problems. In December 2009, Consumer Reports analyzed 2008 model year NHTSA data for sudden acceleration among Toyota, Ford, Chrysler, GM, Honda, and Nissan, finding 52 complaints involving Toyota vehicles or 41% of complaints among these makes, and every other major car maker is affected. Consumer Reports noted that the media publicity around Toyota led to an increase in complaints for 2008 models. In February 2010, National Public Radio obtained the full NHTSA database of 15,000 unintended acceleration complaints over the past decade, and determined that among all manufacturers, Volkswagen had the highest rate of unintended acceleration complaints in 2009 and 2008 (11.5 and 21.6 per 100,000 vehicles respectively), while Suzuki had the highest rate in 2007 and 2006 (27.4 and 24.9 per 100,000 vehicles respectively). Toyota had 7.5, 6.8, 15.2, and 9.7 complaints per 100,000 vehicles in those years. According to NPR's analysis of the NHTSA database, Jaguar, Volvo, and Honda also had high complaints depending on year.

In February 2010, Edmunds.com released its findings on a review of all NHTSA complaints from 2001 to the present day, conducted in light of the Toyota recall crisis. The review found that despite the recall, during the previous decade Toyota ranked 17th among the 20 major car makes in number of complaints per vehicles sold, with a lower rate of customer complaints from its U.S. customers than the Detroit Big Three, along with Honda, Subaru, Hyundai, Nissan, Isuzu, Suzuki, Mazda, Mitsubishi, Volvo, Volkswagen, and BMW. Edmunds.com also noted that any individual can file a NHTSA complaint without providing a Vehicle Identification Number (VIN), which can lead to misleading statistics as "not all NHTSA complaints are created equal" and range from legitimate to nonsensical. On June 5, 2010, NHTSA shut down online access to its complaint database following revelations of redundant, unverifiable entries and improperly secured personal data.

== See also ==
- Automobile safety defect
- Event data recorder (EDR)
- Sudden unintended acceleration
