= John K. Trotter =

American lawyer, judge, and mediator

Honorable John K. Trotter, Jr. (Ret.)
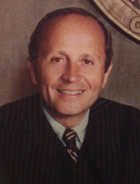

Former Presiding Justice of the California Court of Appeal, 4th District
- In office 1982–1987
- Appointed by: Jerry Brown

Personal details
- Born: February 25, 1934 (age 92) New York City, U.S.
- Education: Loyola College (now Loyola Marymount University), Santa Monica College, University of Southern California Law School (J.D. 1961)
- Profession: lawyer, judge, mediator
- Awards: "Appellate Justice of the Year" Award, by California Trial Lawyers Association; "Justice of the Year Award", by Los Angeles Trial Lawyers Association

John K. Trotter Jr. (born February 25, 1934) is an American jurist who served for 5 years as the Presiding Justice of the California Court of Appeal, Fourth Appellate District, Third Division. After 1987, he was a major contributor to the advancement of Alternative Dispute Resolution (ADR) as one of the founding members of JAMS.

== Biography ==
John K. Trotter, Jr., a native of New York City, New York, was born in 1934. While in high school, he moved with his family to San Diego County. On a basketball scholarship, he attended Loyola College, but he entered the U.S. Army to serve in the Korean War. He then attended Santa Monica College, and as a returning veteran with high grades, he achieved early admittance to University of Southern California Law School. He completed his J.D. degree in 1961.

John Trotter while in private practice specialized in civil litigation, and as a trial lawyer tried in excess of 100 jury trials in State and Federal Court. Trotter was president of the Orange County Bar Association for 1978–1979. Trotter in 1979 became a Superior Court Judge in Orange County. Trotter during the early 1980s helped form Amicus Publico, which later became the Public Law Center for Orange County.

Governor Jerry Brown in April 1982 appointed Trotter to Division Two of the 4th District of the California Court of Appeal. In November 1982, Trotter was appointed as the Presiding Justice of the newly created Division Three of the 4th District, starting out with a 300 case backlog. The court became further backlogged with many new appeals, which Trotter credited to the high number of complex civil cases. Trotter set up a process so that the justices could type their opinions directly into a computer to avoid writing the opinions by hand. By 1985, the justices were writing an average of 140 opinions per year, more than elsewhere in California.

John Trotter in 1987 took early retirement from the California Court of Appeal to join JAMS, an Alternative Dispute Resolution (ADR) organization. While with JAMS, he became one of the leading experts in ADR, with extensive knowledge of ADR hearing formats and procedures. He has successfully resolved thousands of cases involving a variety of types of cases, including mass torts, class actions, and personal injury. Trotter has served as Special Master in several multi-district litigation pharmaceutical matters, in the Toyota Sudden Acceleration case, and other complex cases in both Federal and State court, supervising the claims and payment to thousands of plaintiffs in each litigation.

Trotter has received many honors and recognitions over his career, to name just a few:

- "Orange County ADR Lawyer of the Year", by Best Lawyers
- "Lifetime Achievement Award for his distinguished career as an attorney, judge, and major contributor to the advancement of ADR", by the Orange County Trial Lawyers Association
- "Franklin G. West" Award, Lifetime Achievement Award, by the Orange County Bar Association
- Recognized as a "Best Lawyer, ADR Category", by Best Lawyers in America

== California state judicial service ==
In 1979, Trotter was appointed to the position of Superior Court Judge in Orange County.

In April 1982, Trotter was appointed by Governor Jerry Brown to the position of Associate Justice, California Court of Appeal, 4th District, Division 2, in San Bernardino.

In November 1982, Trotter was appointed by Governor Jerry Brown to the position of Presiding Justice, California Court of Appeal, 4th District, for the newly created Division 3, in Orange County.

In 1983, Trotter was appointed to the temporary position of Associate Justice Pro Tem, Supreme Court of California.

In 1987, Trotter took early retirement from his position at the California Court of Appeal.

== Notable court decision ==
In the case Register Div. of Freedom Newspapers, Inc. v. County of Orange (1984) (158 Cal.App.3d 893.), a newspaper wanted to discover notes and reports by Orange County's claims settlement committee. In this case of a police misconduct lawsuit brought by a jail inmate, Trotter concluded that “the public interest in finding out how decisions to spend public funds are formulated and insuring governmental processes remain open and subject to public scrutiny” outweighs any interest that Orange County might have in keeping secret its settlement policy and decisions. This opinion required public entities to publicly disclose previously secret settlement agreements with tort litigants.

== Other notable cases ==
John Trotter designed the process and supervised the resolution of the wildfire victim claims resulting from the Witch Creek Fire and the Rice Canyon Fire caused by San Diego Gas & Electric power lines in 2007.

In 2010, U.S. District Judge James V. Selna assigned the JAMS neutrals Justice John K. Trotter (Ret.) and Justice Steven J. Stone (Ret.) to be the Special Masters in the Toyota unintended acceleration multi-district litigation.

In 2020, John Trotter was assigned as the Trustee of the Fire Victim Trust as part of the reorganization plan of the 2019 bankruptcy of Pacific Gas and Electric Company resulting from the Camp Fire, Tubbs Fire, Butte Fire, and also a series of wildfires beginning on October 8, 2017, collectively called the 2017 North Bay Fires. A major investigation by station KQED and NPR’s California Newsroom found that John Trotter billed $1,500 an hour for his work as Trustee.
