= Toyota Matrix =

Compact station wagon by Toyota, 2002–2014

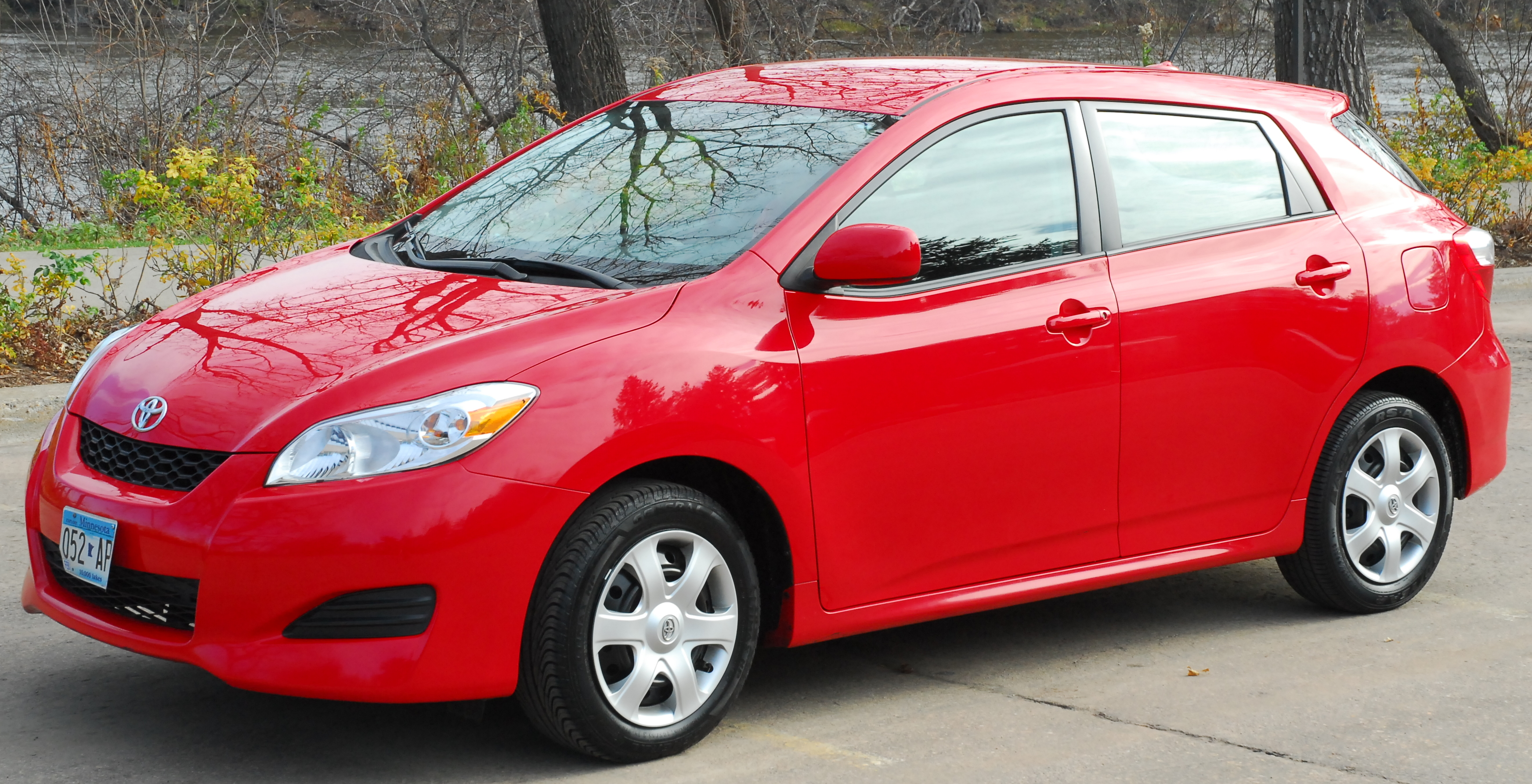
- 2009 Toyota Matrix Standard

Overview
- Manufacturer: Toyota
- Also called: Toyota Corolla Matrix
- Production: 2002–2014
- Model years: 2003–2013 (U.S.); 2003–2014 (Canada)
- Assembly: Cambridge, Canada (TMMC)

Body and chassis
- Class: Compact car (C)
- Body style: 5-door hatchback
- Layout: Front-engine, front-wheel-drive; Front-engine, four-wheel-drive
- Platform: Toyota MC platform
- Related: Toyota Corolla; Pontiac Vibe

Chronology
- Successor: Scion iM / Toyota Corolla iM

The Toyota Matrix, officially named Toyota Corolla Matrix, is a compact hatchback manufactured by Toyota Motor Manufacturing Canada in Cambridge, Ontario and derived from the Corolla. Introduced in 2002 as a 2003 model, the Matrix was the result of a joint venture between Toyota and General Motors, with the GM version being the Pontiac Vibe, which was assembled by New United Motor Manufacturing, Inc. (NUMMI) in Fremont, California, United States.

The Matrix was positioned as a sporty hatchback counterpart of the North American Corolla and was counted as a variant of it in Toyota's sales figures.

Although identical mechanically, and nearly as much internally, the Matrix and Vibe had different sheetmetal and exterior trim designed by their respective brands. Both vehicles are narrow, tall station wagons styled in a quasi-SUV fashion (called a crossover utility vehicle or "CUV" by Toyota) and marketed to a fairly youthful market segment. This type of car is also commonly referred to as a sport wagon.

First sold in February 2002, the Matrix saw a minor facelift for the 2005 model year, and was redesigned completely in 2008 for the 2009 model year, following the tenth generation Corolla. Sales of the Matrix were discontinued in the United States in 2013 and in Canada in 2014.

== First generation (E130; 2002) ==
First generation
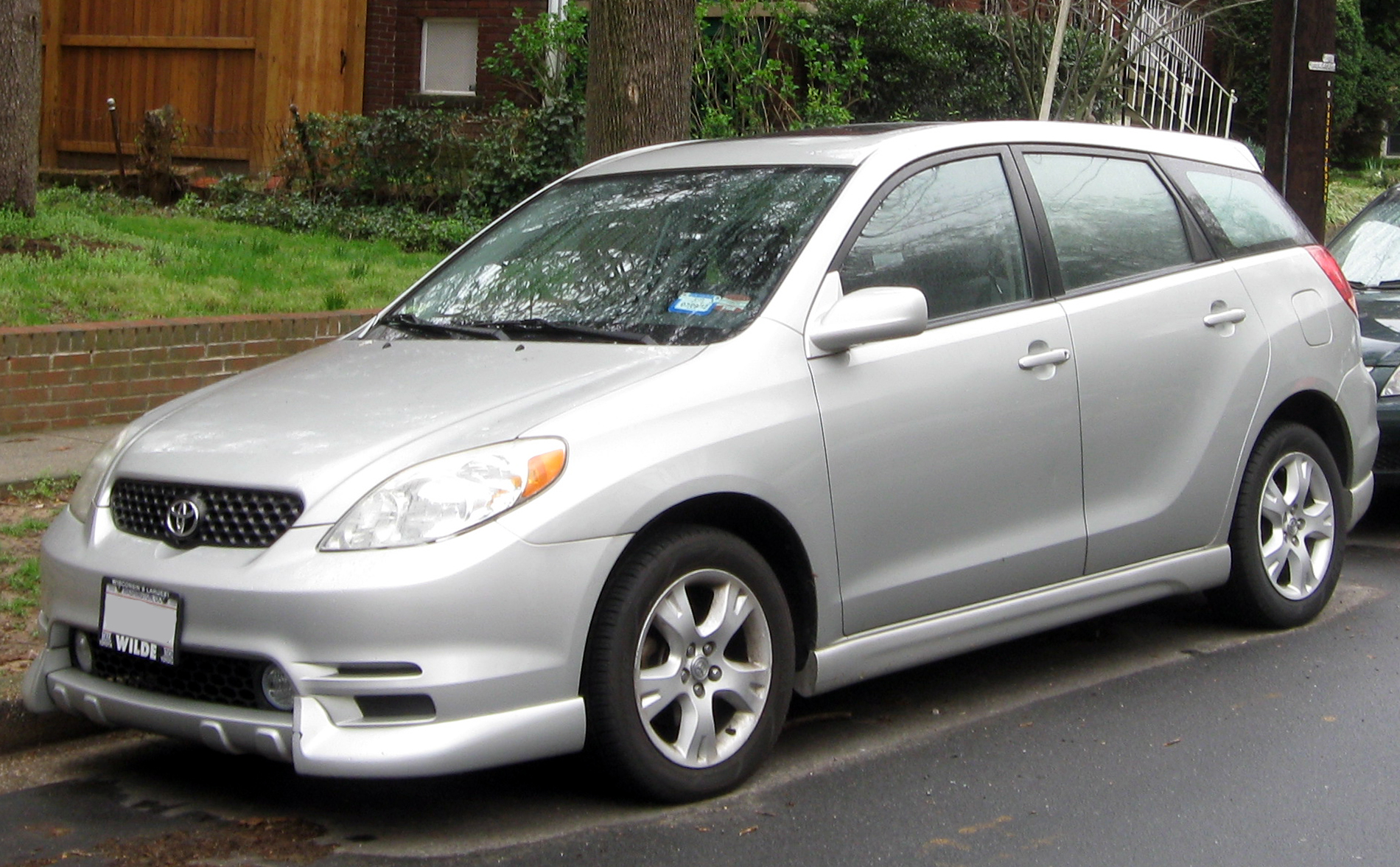
- 2005 Toyota Matrix XR

Overview
- Production: February 2002 – December 2007
- Model years: 2003–2008
- Designer: Craig Kember (1999)

Body and chassis
- Related: Toyota Corolla (E130); Pontiac Vibe/Toyota Voltz; Toyota Celica (T230)

Powertrain
- Engine: 1,794 cc (1.8 L; 109.5 cu in) 1ZZ-FE I4; 123–130 hp (92–97 kW); 1,796 cc (1.8 L; 109.6 cu in) 2ZZ-GE I4; 164–180 hp (122–134 kW)
- Transmission: 4-speed A246E automatic transmission (FWD Base/XR); 4-speed U240E automatic transmission (FWD XRS available in the 2003 only); 4-speed U341F automatic transmission (4WD Base/XR); 5-speed C59 manual; 6-speed C60 manual

Dimensions
- Wheelbase: 102.4 in (2,601 mm)
- Length: 171.3 in (4,351 mm)
- Width: 69.9 in (1,775 mm)
- Height: 61.0 in (1,549 mm)

The Matrix was first introduced in the 2003 model year and based on the Toyota Corolla platform. Relatively unchanged in 2004, a facelift for 2005 brought minor revisions to the exterior – mainly revised styling to the front fascia due to complaints of rubbing the ground on the previous incarnation and replacing the red lenses on the taillamps with clear ones. Also, the center instrument panel was slightly redesigned and featured a Toyota head unit in place of the previous GM-sourced radio.

Two 1.8 L four-cylinder engines were offered in the Matrix: the 1ZZ-FE used in the Corolla, which originally made 130 horsepower (97 kW) in 2003 through 2005 models, but was reduced to 126 horsepower (94 kW) in 2006, and the performance-oriented 2ZZ-GE taken from the Toyota Celica GT-S, which produced 164 horsepower (122 kW) (previously 180 horsepower (130 kW) in 2003, 173 hp (129 kW) in 2004, and 170 horsepower (130 kW) in 2005). The 2006 drop in power was due to new testing standards, and not a change in the engine's actual performance.

In late 2006, Toyota discontinued use of the 2ZZ-GE engine and dropped the XRS from the Matrix lineup to be temporarily replaced by the M-Theory edition. Like each year of the XRS model, the M-Theory was a limited production run of 2500 cars. All wheel drive was also available from 2003 to 2006 when coupled to the 1ZZ engine and automatic transmission, but was dropped at the same time as the XRS.

=== Models ===
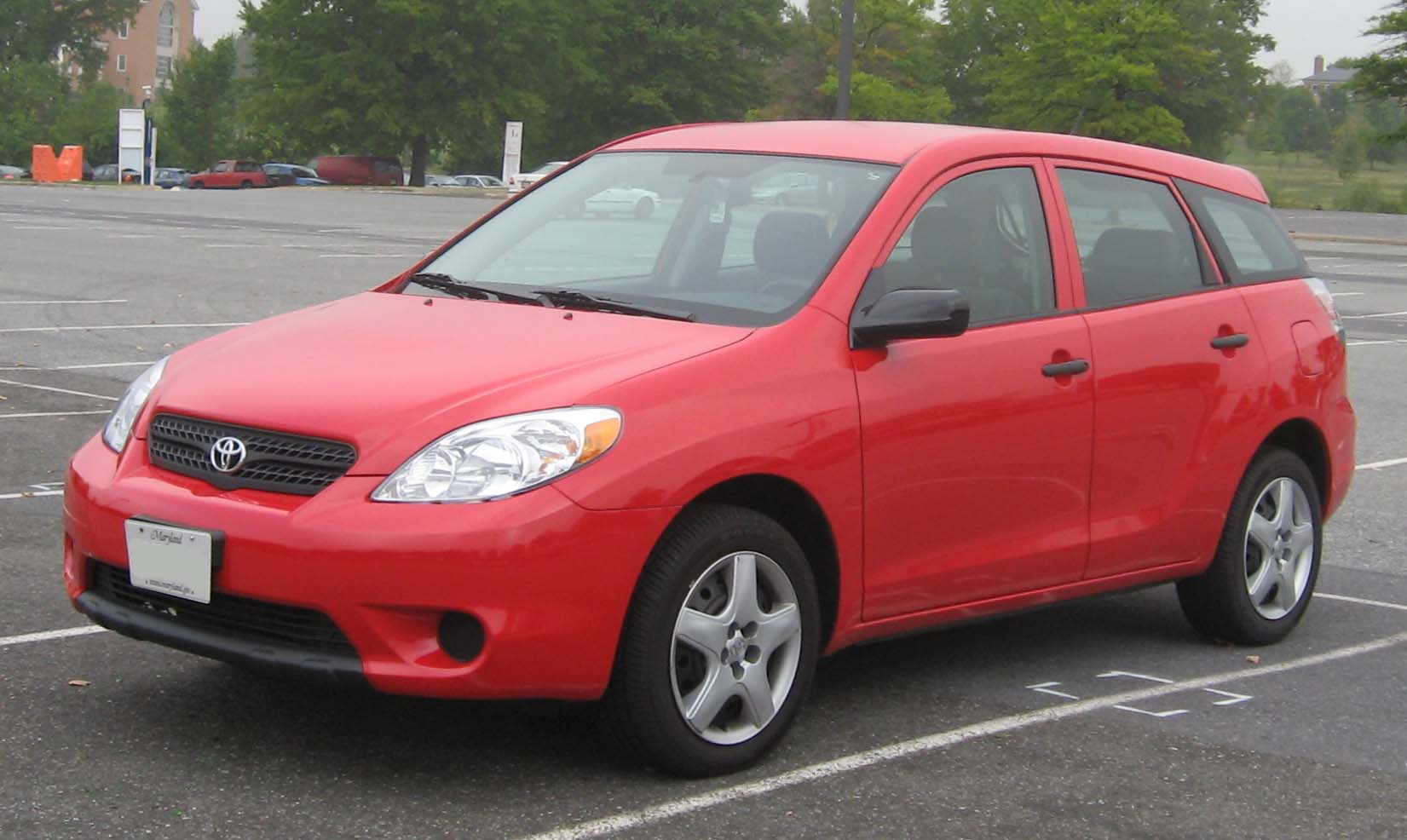

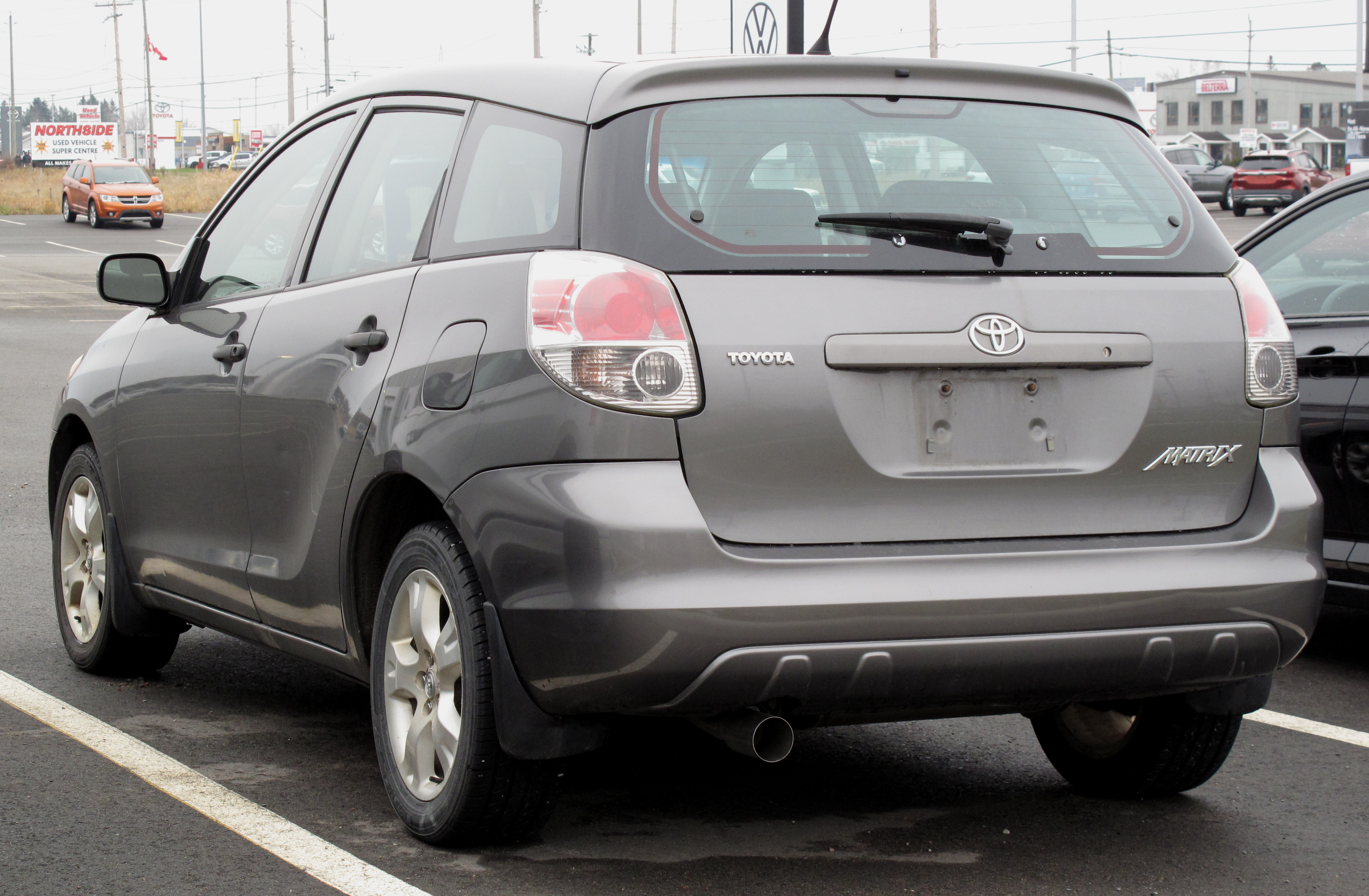
2005–2008 Toyota Matrix Standard

==== Standard (2003–2008) ====
Starting out at US$14,670 in 2003, the no-frills base model came with few options. While it did have standard air conditioning, it left out features like color-keyed mirrors and door handles, blacked out window frames and power mirrors. One option the base model could be had with was AWD for an additional $1,465 (although the actual increase was $2,445, since AWD only came with an automatic transmission). Adding AWD brought the car's curb weight of 2,679 lb (1,215 kg) up to 2,943 lb (1,335 kg) and decreased power by 7 hp (5 kW) and 7 lb⋅ft (9 N⋅m). In 2004, the price of a base model remained unchanged, but by the last year of production, 2008, it had risen to $15,510.

==== XR (2003–2008) ====
The Matrix's XR mid-grade trim level added features like color-matched mirrors and door handles, a leather-wrapped steering wheel, and a panic button on the key fob. Options available with the XR trim included a sunroof, body kit, and 17-inch (430 mm) alloy wheels. A 2003 XR started at US$16,180 and 2,701 lb (1,225 kg), but when equipped with AWD cost at least $18,445 (only $305 less than an XRS) and weighed in at 2,965 lb (1,345 kg). Like the base model, the XR's AWD engine was detuned. Again, the car's price for its second year stayed the same, but in the four years after that, it rose to $16,990.

==== XRS (2003–2006) ====
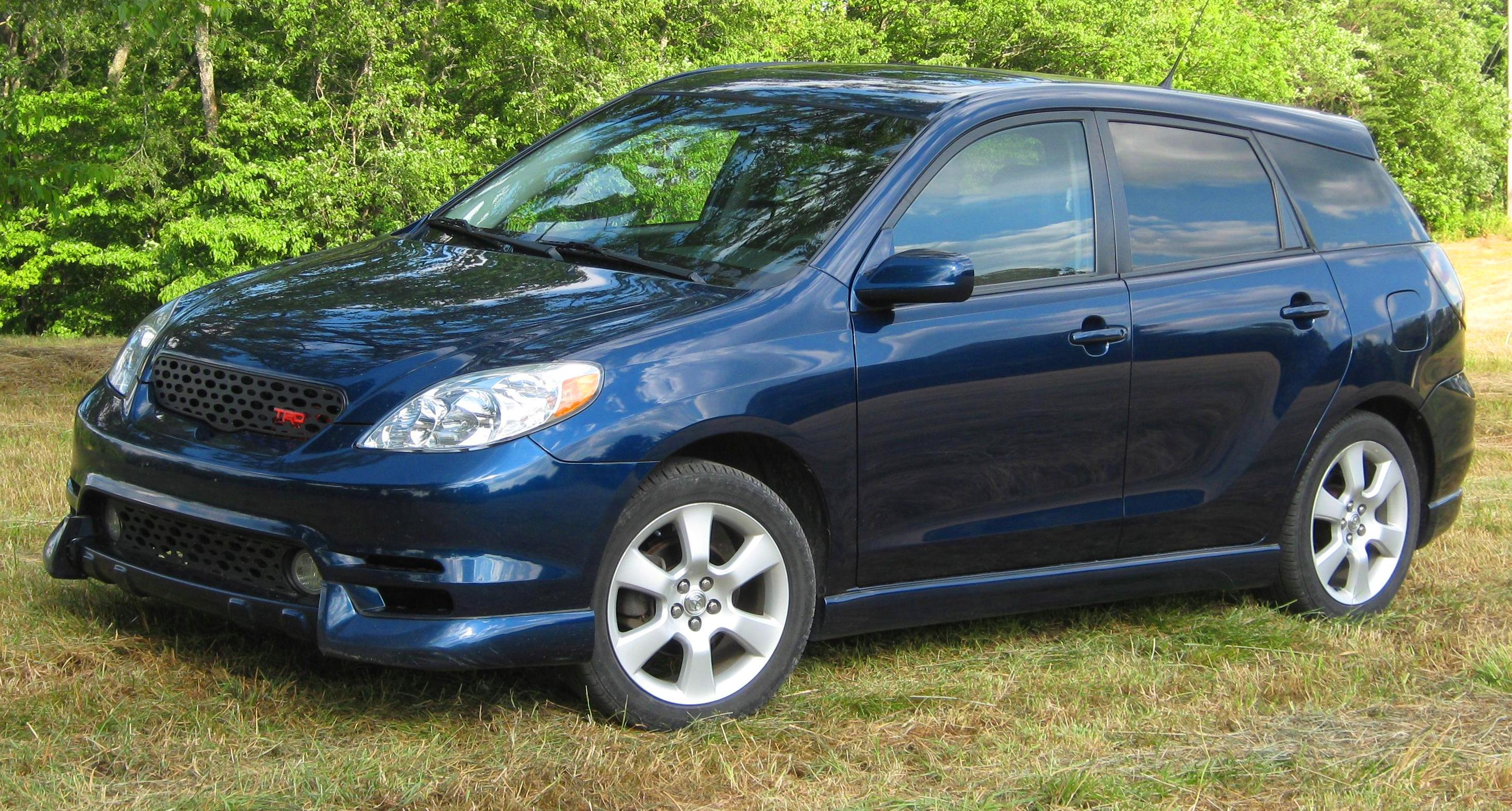
2004 Toyota Matrix XRS with TRD grille

For US$18,750-, the top-of-the-line model came standard with four-wheel disc brakes and six speakers. Also included on all XRS models were anti-lock brakes with Electronic Brakeforce Distribution, 16-inch alloy wheels, and cruise control. In 2003, 17-inch wheels could be had, but only on cars without a sunroof. An option combining 17-inch (430 mm) wheels and a sunroof became available the second year of production. In 2005, an XRS started out at $18,850, and for its last year, it sold for at least $19,250.

The XRS trim included an engine upgrade to Toyota's higher-performance 2ZZ-GE engine. Displacing 1,796 cc (1.796 L; 109.6 cu in), it produced 180 hp (134 kW) and 130 lb⋅ft (176 N⋅m) – a then-rare 100 horsepower-per-liter. While its 11.5:1 compression ratio was a large factor in its performance, the engine could change to a second cam profile at higher RPM through Toyota's VVTL-i and was designed for operation up to 8500 RPM. The engine's high compression necessitates "premium" gasoline (91 octane or above in the (R+M)/2 scale). With the exception of an available automatic in 2003, a six-speed manual transmission was the only gearbox offered in the XRS. A Transitional Low Emission Vehicle (TLEV) its first year of production, the 2ZZ was retrofitted in 2004 with a smog pump and reclassified as an Ultra Low Emission Vehicle (ULEV).

The Matrix was able to come to a full stop from 60 mph (97 km/h) in only 114 feet (35 m). Due to being front wheel drive, the XRS has a weight distribution of 59/41 (front/rear), which may result in understeer when driven hard. It weighs in at a relatively light 2,800 lb (1,300 kg).

==== M-Theory (2007) ====
Not a trim level, the M-Theory edition was a 2007-only appearance package with an exclusive "Speedway Blue" color. For US$1,500, a customer got 17-inch wheels from the Toyota Caldina, a chrome exhaust tip, a numbered plaque (1 of 2500), four wheel disc brakes, and a spoiler. To improve handling, a "sport tuned suspension" and strut tower brace were included.

=== Interior ===
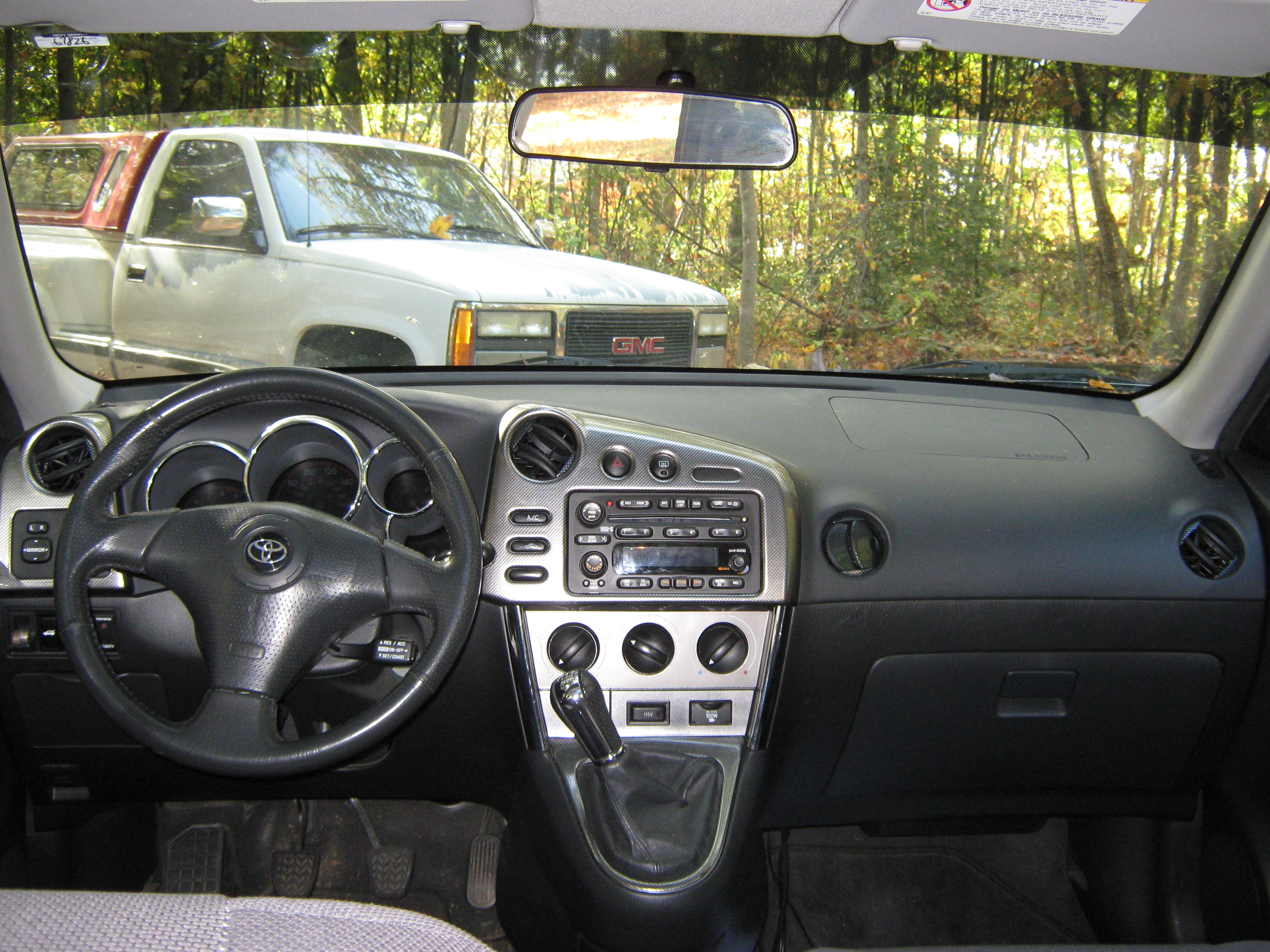
2004 XRS dashboard

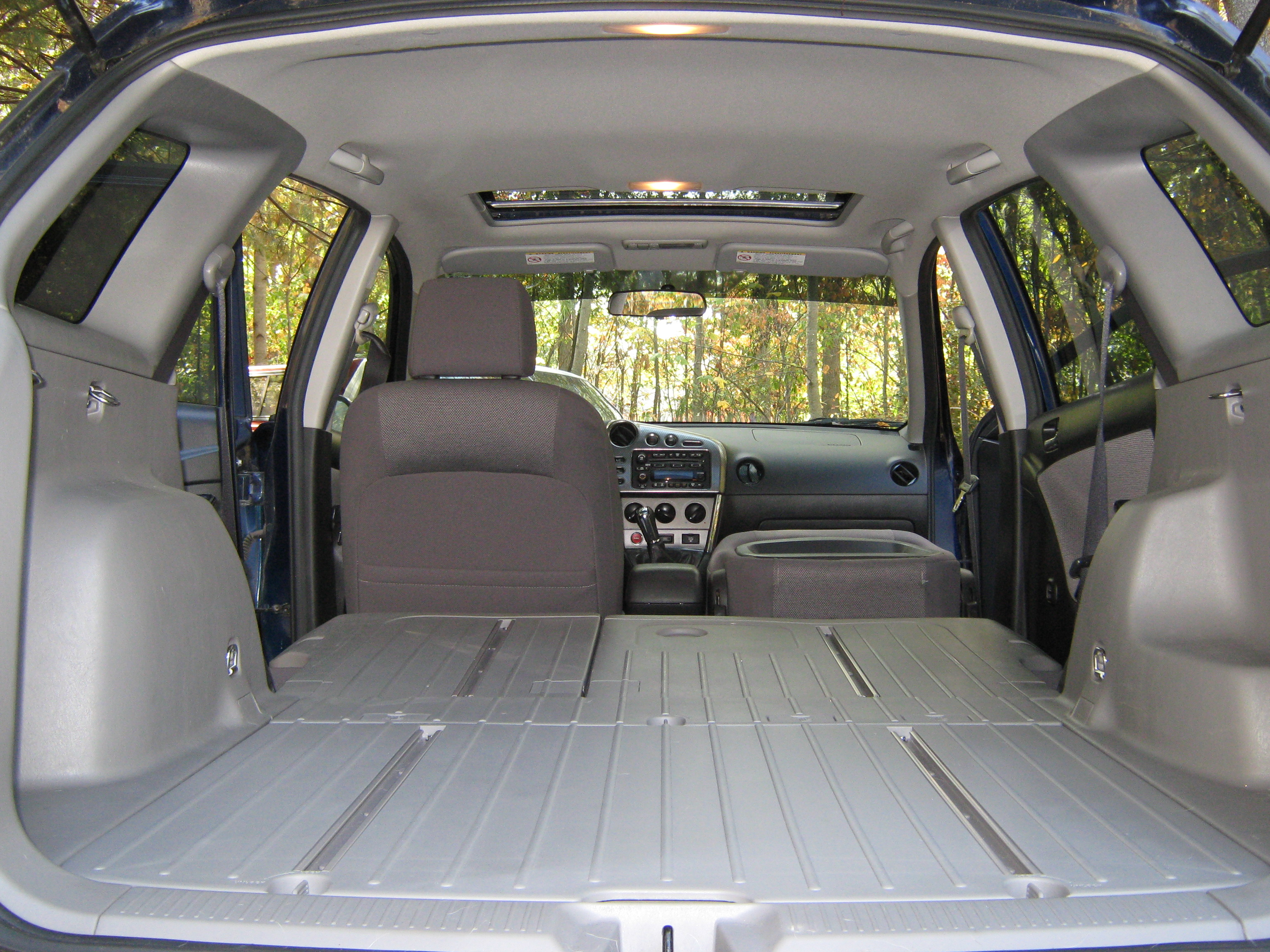
Interior with seats folded

One of the Matrix's unique design features is its interior, particularly the rear 60/40 seats and cargo area. Made with rigid plastic backs, the rear seats fold flat, creating a 53.2 cu ft (1.51 m^{3}) cargo area. In a practicality test, Motor Trend was able to haul more cargo in the Matrix than in a Subaru WRX wagon with 61.1 cu ft (1.73 m^{3}) of space. In addition to the eight tie-downs in the back for attaching the included cargo nets and tonneau cover, the seats and rear floor have integrated rails for installing extra tie-downs.

Up front, the passenger seat also folds flat, accommodating long items like surf boards or allowing drivers to use the tray in its back to hold items like a laptop computer. An electronic device can be charged with the 115 volt/100 watt power inverter (US models only). The first year of production (2003), the instrument cluster was completely red. However, the next year, Toyota made the numbers white while keeping the rest of the gauges red. When the car was updated in 2005, a digital clock was added to the radio bezel.

=== Crash testing ===
NHTSA crash test ratings (2003):

- Frontal Crash Test – Driver:
- Frontal Crash Test – Passenger:
- Side Impact Rating –
- Side Impact Rating – Rear:
- Rollover Rating:

=== Recalls ===
In May 2008, Toyota issued a recall for 2003 and 2004 model year Corollas and Matrixes. The recall notice cites two bolts in each of the front doors as potentially causing the window to come off the track and break. This recall only applies to models equipped with power windows. General Motors issued a recall for the same problem on 2003 and 2004 Pontiac Vibes with power windows at the same time.

On August 26, 2010, Toyota issued a recall for 2005 to 2008 model year Corollas and Matrixes, equipped with the 1ZZ-FE engine and two-wheel drive. The recall notices states that an improperly manufactured Engine Control Module (ECM) can develop a crack in its circuitry, potentially causing the "Check Engine" light to illuminate, harsh shifting, and stalling and/or failure of the engine to start.

On November 20, 2019, along with 2003-2008 Corollas and 2004 and 2005 Yarises, the Matrix of the model years from 2003 to 2008 was recalled in Mexico due to these cars containing Takata frontal passenger airbags which might degrade due to weather exposure and variation of high temperatures, which usually occurs on cities with extreme weather, which might cause serious injuries on passengers. Toyota has advised all owners of the following cars to replace these faulty frontal passenger airbags or all airbags, depending on the version. Toyota of Mexico has notified PROFECO that in the Mexican market exists 618 vehicles in addition to these three recalled vehicles. The replacing campaign will go due November 22.

== Second generation (E140; 2008) ==
Second generation
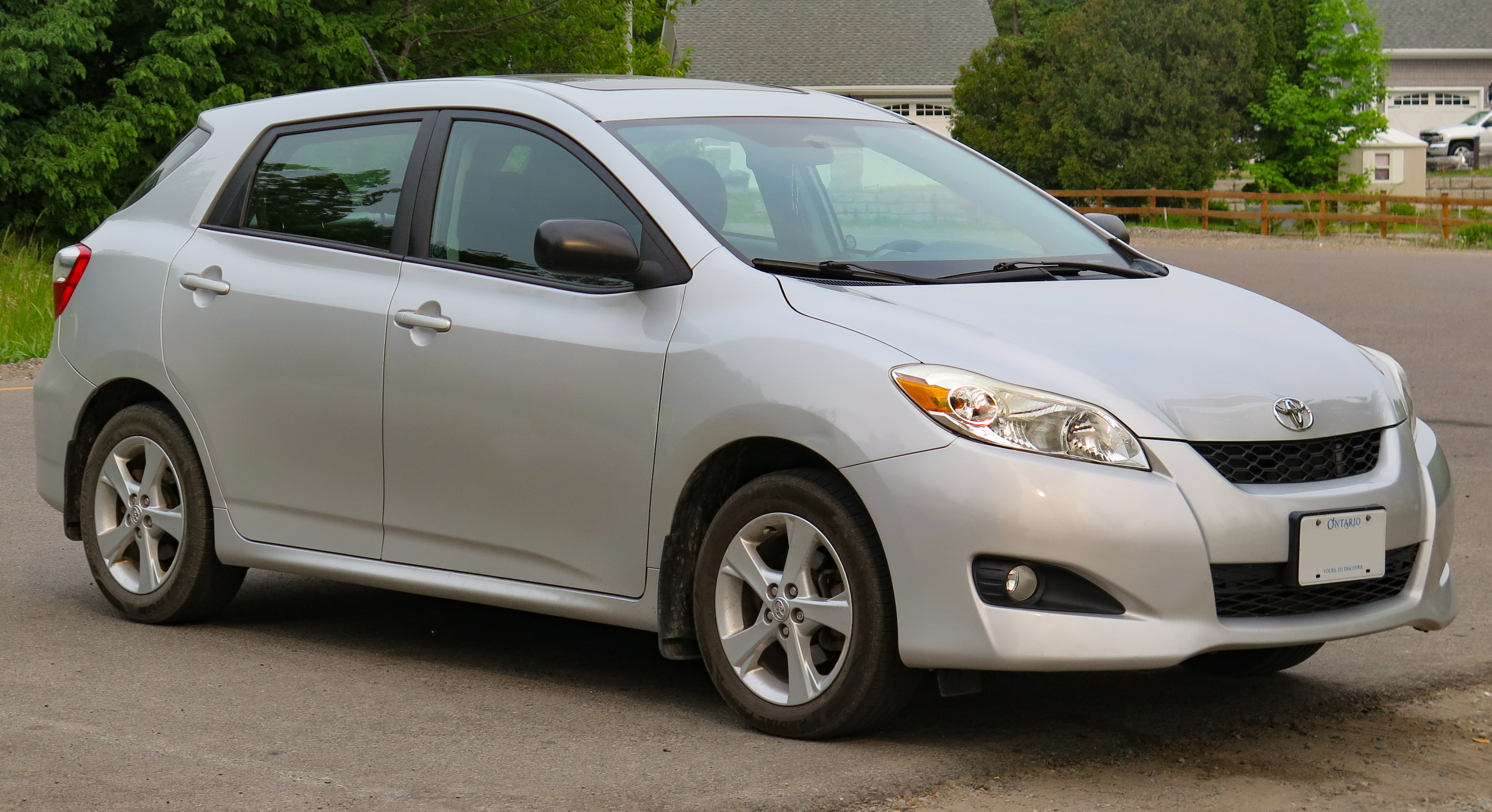
- 2014 Toyota Matrix Touring Value Package

Overview
- Production: January 2008 – 2014
- Model years: 2009–2013 (U.S.); 2009–2014 (Canada)
- Designer: Hirofumi Fukui (2005); Yoshiyasu Neuchi and Shigetoshi Kozai (2011 facelift: 2009)

Body and chassis
- Related: Toyota Corolla (E140)

Powertrain
- Engine: 1,797 cc (1.8 L; 109.7 cu in) 2ZR-FE I4; 132 hp (98 kW); 2,362 cc (2.4 L; 144.1 cu in) 2AZ-FE I4; 158 hp (118 kW)
- Transmission: 4-speed automatic; 5-speed automatic; 5-speed manual

Dimensions
- Wheelbase: 102.4 in (2,601 mm)
- Length: 173.0 in (4,394 mm); AWD: 171.9 in (4,366 mm)
- Width: 69.5 in (1,765 mm)
- Height: 61.0 in (1,549 mm); XRS & AWD: 61.4 in (1,560 mm)

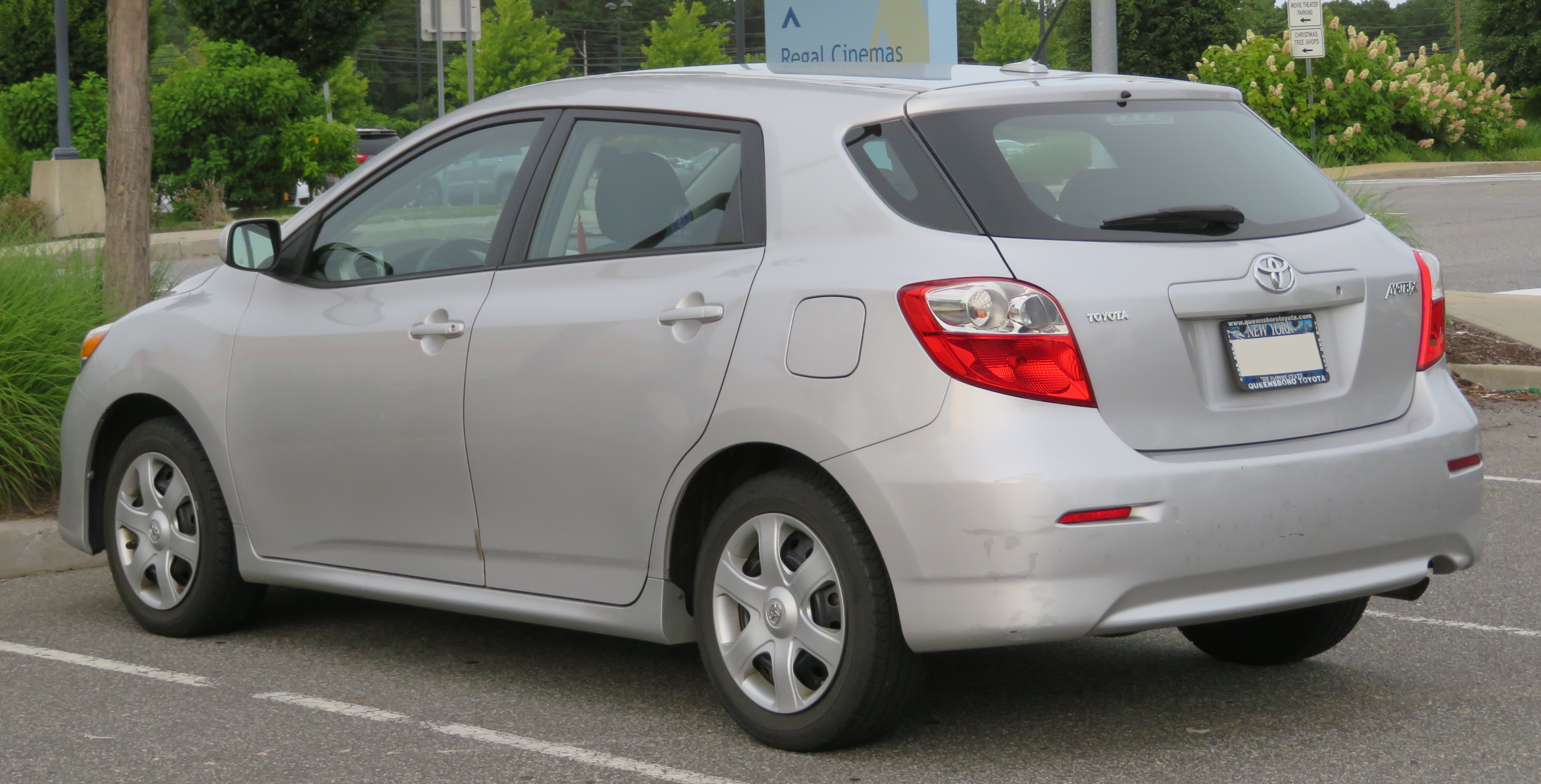
Rear view

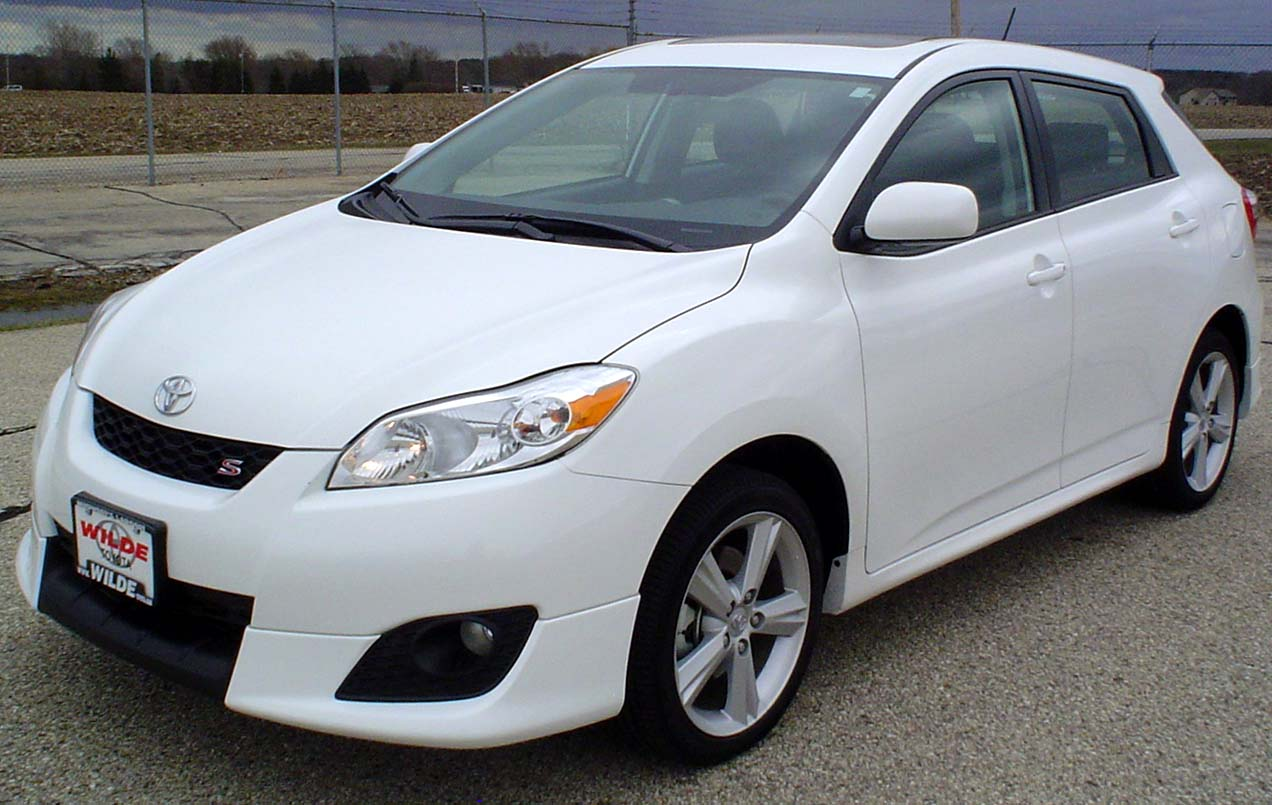
2009 Toyota Matrix S

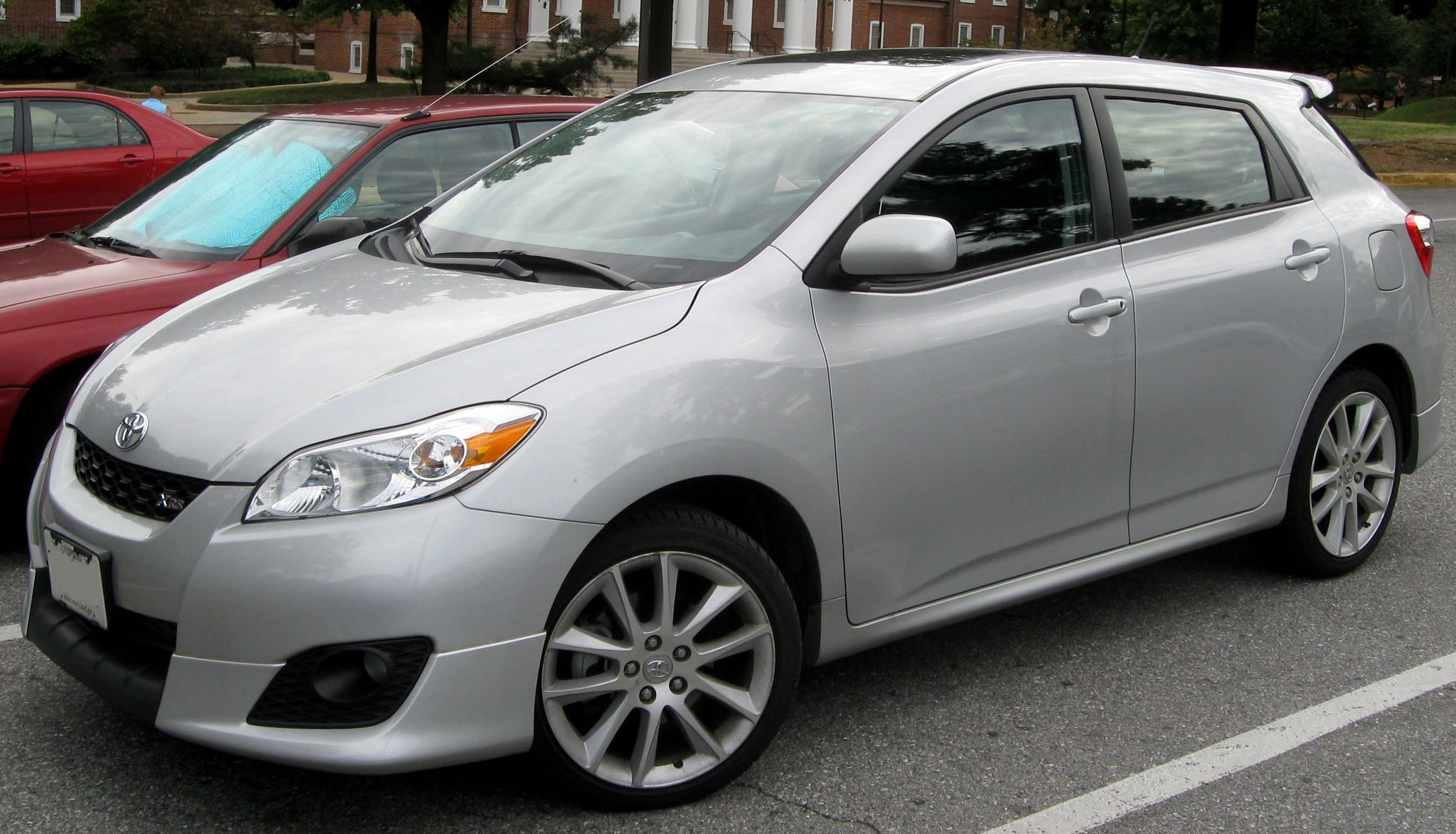
Toyota Matrix XRS

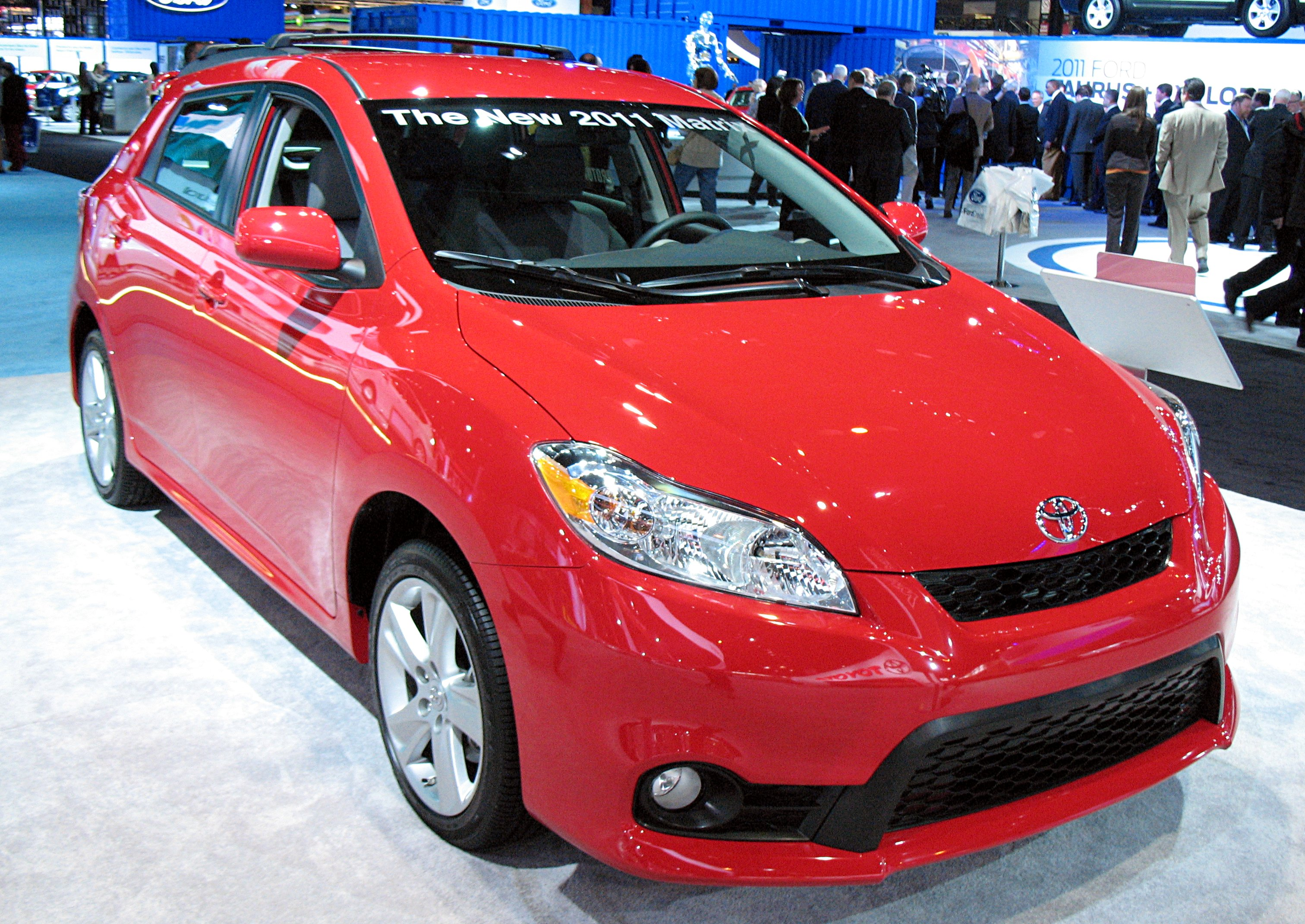
2011 Toyota Matrix XR AWD

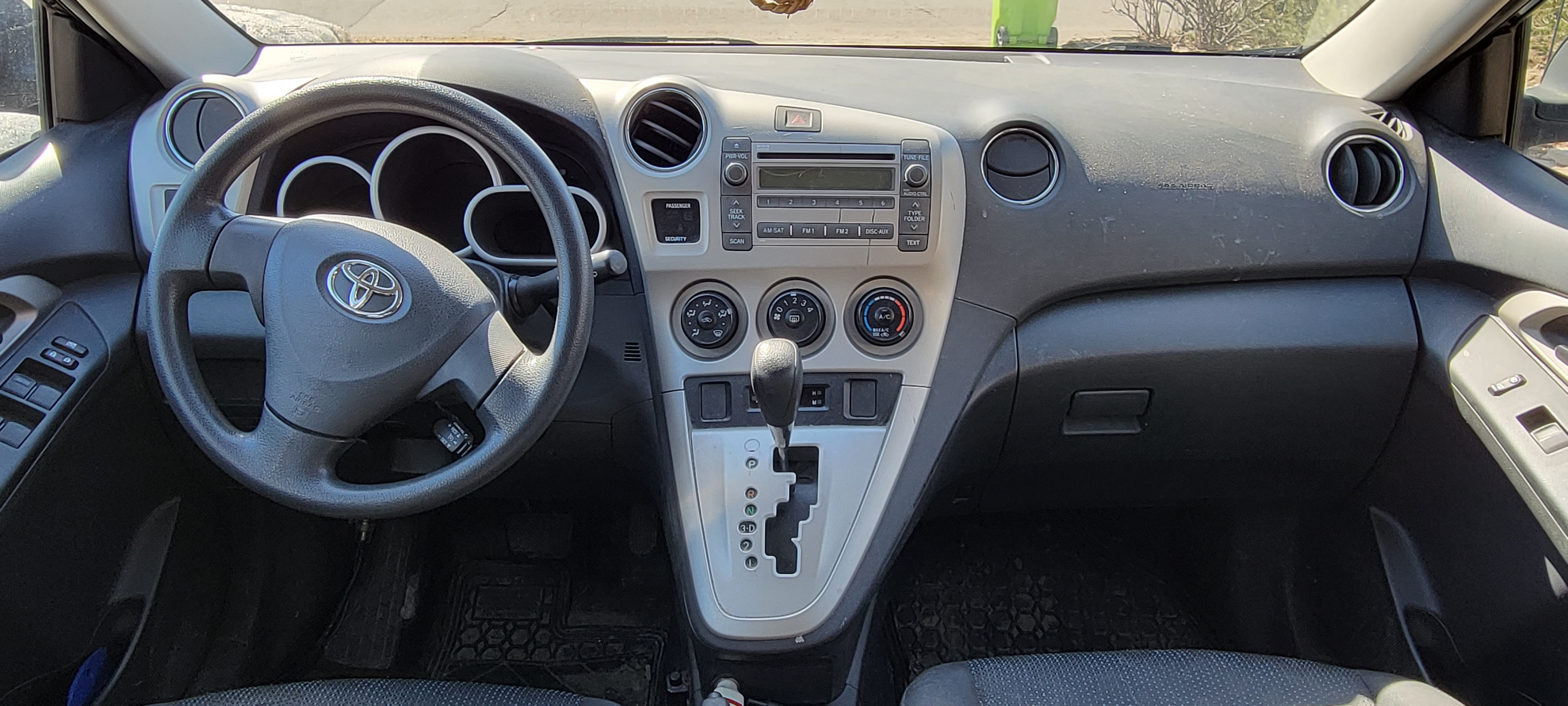
Interior

Initially rumored by Toyota and auto news media as a Matrix replacement named the Blade, the second generation Matrix was unveiled on October 31, 2007, at the Specialty Equipment Market Association (SEMA) show in Las Vegas, and was first available at dealerships in February 2008, as a 2009 model. The sibling of the Matrix, the Vibe, was also upgraded, but production of that model ended after 2009 when the entire Pontiac brand was retired.

In the United States, three trim levels (Standard [base], S and XRS) are offered, as well as two inline fours: a 1,797 cc (1.797 L; 109.7 cu in) 2ZR-FE for the base model (chassis code ZRE142) and a 2,362 cc (2.362 L; 144.1 cu in) 2AZ-FE for the S and XRS trims. The former is offered with either a five-speed manual or four-speed automatic transmission, while the larger engine is equipped with either a manual or automatic five-speed transmission. In addition, the S trim can be equipped with a four-speed automatic and all-wheel drive.

Canadian buyers are offered in four trim levels: a 1.8 L-powered base model, and the XR, XRS and AWD models with a 2.4-liter engine.

This generation marks the first time the Matrix was sold in Mexico. The Matrix comes only in two trim levels to Mexico: Base and XR.

For the 2011 model year, the Matrix received redesigned exterior and interior elements, including front and rear fascias, wheels and seat fabrics. The radio was also changed to allow for Bluetooth capability.

=== Models ===
In 2008, Toyota began offering different trim levels in the United States and Canada. The XR trim became exclusive for Canada, and the S trim was released only in the U.S., while AWD remained available in both markets after 2009. All vehicles have an independent front suspension with MacPherson struts, but only XRS trim and cars equipped with all-wheel drive and 158 horsepower, feature an independent rear suspension using double wishbones instead of a semi-independent torsion beam. The 2009 models have less interior space than the preceding years, with a total of 48.9 cu ft (1.38 m^{3}) compared to the original 53.2 cu ft (1.51 m^{3}).

The XRS trim was dropped from the U.S. lineup for the 2011 model year.

=== Safety ===
All models come standard with side torso airbags, side curtain airbags, anti-lock braking and electronic brakeforce distribution. For the 2010 model the previously optional Vehicle Stability Control and traction control systems became standard.

Toyota's Smart Stop Technology was added to the Matrix for the 2011 model year.

The Matrix is rated "Good" in both frontal and side Insurance Institute for Highway Safety (IIHS) crash tests.

NHTSA crash test ratings (2009):

- Frontal Crash Test – Driver:
- Frontal Crash Test – Passenger:
- Side Impact Rating – Driver:
- Side Impact Rating – Passenger:
- Rollover Rating:

=== Recalls ===
The 2009 to 2010 model year Matrix (and its Vibe relative) are subject to the 2009–2011 Toyota vehicle recalls regarding floor mat and accelerator pedal replacement.

On October 10, 2012, Toyota issued a recall for 2009 model year Corolla and Matrix, along with 10 other models. The recall notices states that improperly lubricated driver's side power window master switch may develop a "notchy" or sticky feel, and that improper aftermarket lubrication may present a fire hazard. The repair involves lubricating the switch assembly with a special fluorine grease.

=== Discontinuation ===
On August 5, 2013, Toyota announced an end to production of the Matrix for the US market after the 2013 model year due to declining sales, and that there were no plans to replace it with another vehicle. The Canadian market continued for the 2014 model year, with those assembled in Cambridge, Ontario by Toyota Motor Manufacturing Canada. The Matrix was then discontinued in Canada and was not offered for the 2015 model year. Toyota continued to sell a range of compact hatchbacks in North America through its Scion brand. On September 1, 2016, "the Scion brand transitioned to Toyota." For the 2017 model year, the Corolla iM would be the successor of the Matrix. For the 2019 model year, the newest iteration has been released as the Corolla hatchback.

== Sales ==
Matrix sales figures in the United States are included in the Corolla's total, which meant its sales figures in the US is unknown.

Year	Canada
2004	20,017
2005	24,048
2006	23,536
2007	21,369
2008	23,549
2009	22,526
2010	19,093
2011	14,895
2012	12,982
2013	10,689
2014	7,130
2015	295
