= Electronic throttle control =

Automobile technology

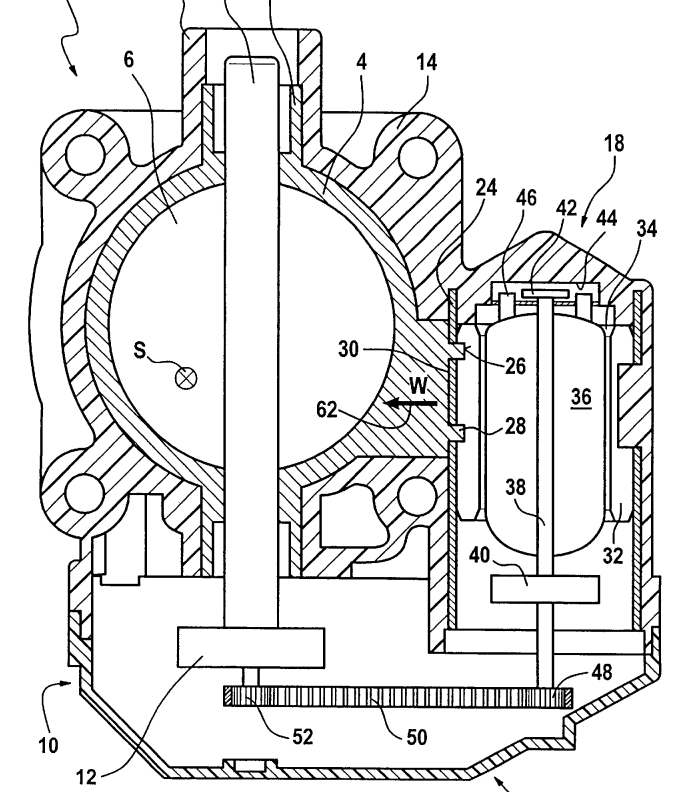
Throttle body with integrated motor actuator

Electronic throttle control (ETC) is an automotive technology that uses electronics to replace the traditional mechanical linkages between the driver's input such as a foot pedal to the vehicle's throttle mechanism which regulates speed or acceleration. This concept is often called drive by wire, and sometimes called accelerate-by-wire or throttle-by-wire.

== Operation ==
A typical ETC system consists of three major components: (i) an accelerator pedal module (ideally with two or more independent sensors), (ii) a throttle valve that can be opened and closed by an electric motor (sometimes referred to as an electric or electronic throttle body (ETB)), and (iii) a powertrain or engine control module (PCM or ECM). The ECM is a type of electronic control unit (ECU), which is an embedded system that employs software to determine the required throttle position by calculations from data measured by other sensors, including the accelerator pedal position sensors, engine speed sensor, vehicle speed sensor, and cruise control switches. The electric motor is then used to open the throttle valve to the desired angle via a closed-loop control algorithm within the ECM.

== Benefits ==
The benefits of electronic throttle control are largely unnoticed by most drivers because the aim is to make the vehicle power-train characteristics seamlessly consistent irrespective of prevailing conditions, such as engine temperature, altitude, and accessory loads. Electronic throttle control is also working 'behind the scenes' to dramatically improve the ease with which the driver can execute gear changes and deal with the dramatic torque changes associated with rapid accelerations and decelerations.

Electronic throttle control facilitates the integration of features such as cruise control, traction control, stability control, and precrash systems and others that require torque management, since the throttle can be moved irrespective of the position of the driver's accelerator pedal. ETC provides some benefit in areas such as air-fuel ratio control, exhaust emissions and fuel consumption reduction, and also works in concert with other technologies such as gasoline direct injection.

== Failure modes ==
There is no mechanical linkage between the accelerator pedal and the throttle valve with electronic throttle control. Instead, the position of the throttle valve (i.e., the amount of air in the engine) is fully controlled by the ETC software via the electric motor. But just opening or closing the throttle valve by sending a new signal to the electric motor is an open loop condition and leads to inaccurate control. Thus, most, if not all, current ETC systems use closed loop feedback systems, such as PID control, whereby the ECU tells the throttle to open or close a certain amount. The throttle position sensor(s) are continually read and then the software makes appropriate adjustments to reach the desired amount of engine power.

There are two primary types of throttle position sensor (TPS): a potentiometer or a non-contact Hall-effect sensor (magnetic device). A potentiometer is a satisfactory way for non-critical applications such as volume control on a radio. However, these devices which are mechanical in nature can wear, get contaminated by dirt and dust and can cause erratic operation in a motor vehicle. The more reliable solution is the magnetic (or optical) coupling, which makes no physical contact, so will never be subject to failing by wear. This is an insidious failure as it may not provide any symptoms until there is total failure. All cars having a TPS have what is known as a 'limp-home-mode'. When the car goes into the limp-home-mode it is because the accelerator, engine control computer and the throttle are not connecting to each other in which they can function together. The engine control computer shuts down the signal to the throttle position motor and a set of springs in the throttle set it to a fast idle, fast enough to get the transmission in gear but not so fast that driving may be dangerous.

Software or electronic failures within the ETC have been suspected by some to be responsible for alleged incidents of unintended acceleration. A series of investigations by the U.S. National Highway Traffic Safety Administration (NHTSA) were unable to get to the bottom of all of the reported incidents of unintended acceleration in 2002 and later model year Toyota and Lexus vehicles. A February 2011 report issued by a team from NASA (which studied the source code and electronics for a 2005 Camry model, at the request of NHTSA) did not rule out software malfunctions as a potential cause. In October 2013, the first jury to hear evidence about Toyota's source code (from expert witness Michael Barr) found Toyota liable for the death of a passenger in a September 2007 unintended acceleration collision in Oklahoma.
