= Michael Barr (software engineer) =

American software engineer

Michael Barr is a software engineer specializing in software design for medical devices and other embedded systems. He is a past editor-in-chief of Embedded Systems Design magazine and author of four books and more than seventy articles about embedded software.

Barr has often worked as an expert witness, including testifying in the Toyota Sudden Unintended Acceleration litigation. In October 2013, after reviewing Toyota's source code as part of a team of seven engineers, he testified in a jury trial in Oklahoma that led to a "guilty by software defects" finding against Toyota. There are several technical articles that discuss the various electronic throttle control defects he testified were linked to unintended acceleration that caused deaths in Toyota Camry vehicles.

Earlier in his career, Barr testified as an expert witness in the DirecTV anti-piracy end user litigation, which involved over 25,000 end users. He has also worked as a testifying expert witness in other high-profile litigation involving software, such as SmartPhone Technologies vs Apple and in a copyright dispute about EA's early Madden Football video game source code.

Barr began his career working as an embedded programmer at Hughes Network Systems, where he wrote software for products including the first-generation Hughes-branded DirecTV receiver, which sold in the millions of units. He subsequently wrote embedded software at TSI TelSys, PropHead Development, and Netrino. His four books are METACOMPILER (a science fiction novel based on embedded systems), Programming Embedded Systems in C with GNU Development Tools, Embedded Systems Dictionary (co-authored by Jack Ganssle), and "Embedded C Coding Standard".

Barr studied electrical engineering at the University of Maryland in College Park, from which he earned a Bachelor of Science degree in 1994 and a Master of Science degree in 1997. From 2000 to 2002, he taught ENEE 447 Operating Systems Theory as an adjunct professor in the same Department of Electrical and Computer Engineering.
