= Whynot =

Whynot may refer to:

== Media ==
- WHYNOT, an affiliate of Radio Free Asia

== Place ==
- Whynot, Mississippi, U.S.
- Whynot, North Carolina, U.S.

== Jazz ==
- Whynot Records, a Japanese jazz record label
- WhyNot Jazz Room, a jazz club in New York City

== People ==
- John Whynot, Canadian musician, producer, and composer

== See also ==
- Why Not (disambiguation)
- Wynot, Nebraska
