= Dual circulation =

Strategy to reorient China's economy

- Simplified Chinese: 国内国际双循环
- Traditional Chinese: 國內國際雙循環
Transcriptions
Standard Mandarin
- Hanyu Pinyin: guónèi guójì shuāng xúnhuán

Domestic-international dual circulation is a Chinese government strategy to reorient the country's economy by prioritizing domestic consumption ("internal" or "domestic circulation"), making the economy more self-reliant in key sectors, reducing dependence on foreign markets, while also remaining open to international trade and investment ("external" or "international circulation"). Dual circulation involves making the domestic market less dependent on external fluctuations and shocks while also making the country's economy more indispensable to the outside world.

The economic policy of dual circulation was first put forward in May 2020 by the Politburo Standing Committee of the Chinese Communist Party (CCP) and later revised by CCP General Secretary Xi Jinping to stress prioritizing "internal circulation".

== History ==
The intellectual predecessor of dual circulation was the "great international circulation", a strategy of economic growth through export-oriented production, first articulated by Wang Jian in 1988.

In 2020, the COVID-19 pandemic brought a global economic downturn and a decline in demand. In response to these pressures as well as the China–United States trade war and American trade restrictions against Huawei and other Chinese firms, the Chinese government adopted a greater domestic focus. In the Chinese view, these trends towards anti-globalization, populism, and protectionism in Western countries means that China should expand its domestic markets and economic self-reliance.

On 14 May 2020, at a meeting of the CCP Politburo Standing Committee, Xi Jinping proposed a "new development pattern of mutual benefit through domestic-international dual circulation". On 23 May 2020, at the Chinese People's Political Consultative Conference 13th National Committee, Xi said the country needed a development program that "takes the domestic market as the mainstay while letting internal and external markets boost each other". In an October 2020 speech to the CCP's Central Financial and Economic Affairs Commission, Xi stated that "China must tighten international production chains' dependence on China, forming powerful countermeasures and deterrent capabilities against foreigners artificially cutting off supplies." Dual circulation was made part of the fourteenth five-year plan for 2021 to 2025, which was drafted during the fifth plenum of the 19th Central Committee of the CCP in October 2020. On 4 November 2020, during his keynote speech by video at the opening ceremony for the third China International Import Expo, Xi said that this policy "is not any kind of closed-off domestic circulation, but rather an increasingly open domestic-international dual circulation, not just for China's own development needs, but also to benefit the people of all countries".

In a 2021 Qiushi article, Xi cited "backlash against economic globalization" and that "the COVID-19 pandemic exacerbated the trend of deglobalization and many countries have now become more inward-looking." He said by April 2020 he "realized just how much things had changed; the environment and conditions that had facilitated large-scale imports and exports were no longer in place" and "given these new circumstances, we needed to come up with new thinking to steer development". Xi added that the new development dynamic was "a strategic and proactive step for taking the initiative in development, a major historic mission that must be fulfilled in the new development stage, and an important measure for applying the new development philosophy". Xi stated:

In 1936, Mao Zedong made a remark that still holds true for us even today. He said, "No matter how complicated, grave, and harsh the circumstances, what a military leader needs most of all is the ability to function independently in organizing and employing the forces under his command. . . . Failure to do so spells defeat. The initiative is not something imaginary but is concrete and material." If we can, by dint of our own efforts, ensure unimpeded domestic flow to effectively shield ourselves from harm, we will have the vigour and vitality to not only survive but thrive amid volatile international situations, making it impossible for anyone to keep us down or to back us into a corner.

Xi also added:

In practice, there are some misunderstandings that we need to guard against. First, some people tend to only speak about the first half, or the domestic flow element as the main factor, of the new development dynamic, and call for China to sharply reverse its opening to the outside world. Second, some others speak only of the latter half, or the positive interplay between domestic flow and international engagement, and still subscribe to the old development dynamic of large-scale imports and exports with two ends of the economic process—markets and resources—being located abroad, despite the changes to the international landscape. . . . All of these understandings are incomplete or even erroneous.

Xi said "the essence of the new development dynamic is realizing a high level of self-reliance". Xi said China was creating "a strong gravitational pull for global production factors and resources, a strong ability to hold our own amid intense international competition, and powerful momentum for the allocation of global resources". He stated China should see "that China's domestic circulation plays a stronger guiding role in dual-flow dynamics and foster new advantages for China's participation in international economic cooperation and competition".

== Implementation and impact ==
Xi states that there are two guiding principles for China's approach to international engagement under its dual circulation strategy. The first principle is that China should actively engage in cooperation with all countries and regions that are willing to cooperate with it in order to form a diversified pattern of cooperation. The second is that the more China opens up to the outside world, the more it must also pay attention to its own security, focus on its competitiveness, and manage opening up to mitigate risk.

There are two prongs to the dual circulation strategy. First, it seeks to rely more on China's domestic consumers. Second, it seeks to innovate more domestically developed technology and thereby reduce China's reliance on western technology.

Dual circulation has recalibrated China's industrial policy to place a renewed emphasis on state-led growth and self-reliance based on China's domestic market of 1.4 billion consumers, which include over 400 million middle income consumers. In an effort to facilitate the strategy by closing technology gaps, China spent 2.5% of its GDP on research and development during the thirteenth five-year plan of 2016–2020.

Dual circulation is a key part of China's fourteenth five-year plan (2021–2025). Proposals for implementing the policy include government support for domestic technology companies and working to attract more foreign investment. Analyst Wang Wen of the Chongyang Institute for Financial Studies speculated that it would include government support for the service and energy sectors.

== Analysis ==
Some observers say the dual circulation plan is not that different from previous Chinese government efforts to refocus the economy. According to Chris Buckley of The New York Times, dual circulation appears to some as a "glossy reboot" of past efforts and "Chinese leaders have promised since at least 2006 to make domestic consumer spending a bigger share of economic activity, reducing reliance on exports and infrastructure building — with mixed success." Julian Gewirtz suggested that the "dual circulation" slogan was introduced to "force focus, mobilization and prioritization".

Analysts said that the strategy would involve supporting domestic businesses and reducing China's dependence on imports, including for energy, microchips, and other technology. Economist Yu Yongding supports China's economic strategy of dual circulation. In Yu's view, the initial reason to develop dual circulation was for economic benefit. Following United States President Donald Trump's emphasis on decoupling the U.S. from China and the U.S. government placing Chinese companies on the Entity List, Yu's view is that dual circulation has now also become a matter of security for China. China must therefore act to ensure its China's food and energy security. To counter U.S. efforts to decouple, Yu advocates policy he describes using the metaphors of "spare wheels" and "body-lock" (the latter metaphor drawn from the sport of wrestling). "Spare wheels" can include a variety of policy measures, such as providing support to China's high-tech national champions or long-term efforts to encourage the development of domestic engineering talent. The "body-lock" involves China opposing efforts to isolate or sanction it by actively building links in other countries, including with U.S. business, in the hope that these cooperative activities will develop constituencies opposed to isolating China. According to Oriana Skylar Mastro, "the idea is that the more reliant the world is on China, the less likely countries will be to join an anti-China coalition." Economist Yao Yang described the policy as a response to worsening China–United States relations, saying that "China needs to prepare for the worst-case scenario".

Dual circulation also involves growing the Chinese middle class in order to increase domestic consumption. Economist Michael Pettis said that the plan would require transferring wealth from the government to private citizens, which would not be easy. According to the South China Morning Post, in late 2020 it remained "unclear whether China is ready to make such deep-rooted changes".

The Economist summarized the strategy as "keeping China open to the world (the 'great international circulation'), while reinforcing its own market (the 'great domestic circulation')". More specifically, The Economist said that dual circulation involves making the Chinese economy more open to foreign companies in order to make them dependent on China, which in turn would give the Chinese government more geopolitical leverage.

== See also ==
- Ideology of the Chinese Communist Party
- Reform and opening up
- Xi Jinping Thought
