= Marek Kwiek =

Polish scholar of higher education and science studies

Marek Kwiek MAE
- Occupation: Academic
- Awards: Reagan–Fascell Democracy Fellowship; Member of the European Academy of Sciences and Arts; Member of Academia Europaea

Academic work
- Discipline: Higher education Science studies Sociology of science
- Institutions: Adam Mickiewicz University in Poznań
- Main interests: Higher education research International research collaboration Stratification in science

Marek Kwiek MAE is a Polish academic and professor of higher education and science studies. He is a professor at Adam Mickiewicz University in Poznań, where he serves as Director of the Institute for Advanced Studies in Social Sciences and Humanities and holds the UNESCO Chair in Institutional Research and Higher Education Policy.

== Academic career ==
Kwiek has been affiliated with Adam Mickiewicz University in Poznań throughout his academic career. He was appointed university professor in 2001 and became a full professor in 2009. He has been director of the university's Center for Public Policy Studies since 2002, and became director of its Institute for Advanced Studies in Social Sciences and Humanities in 2021. In 2012, he was appointed chairholder of the UNESCO Chair in Institutional Research and Higher Education Policy.

His international academic appointments have included periods at the University of Virginia, the University of California, Berkeley, the National Endowment for Democracy, the UCL Institute of Education, and the German Centre for Higher Education Research and Science Studies. He was a Fulbright Foundation Scholar at the University of Virginia from 1994 to 1995 and a Kościuszko Foundation Scholar at the University of California, Berkeley, from 1997 to 1998. From 2002 to 2003, he was a Reagan–Fascell Democracy Fellow at the National Endowment for Democracy. He was a Professorial Visiting Fellow at the UCL Institute of Education from 2012 to 2013. From 2022 to 2024, he was a visiting researcher at the German Centre for Higher Education Research and Science Studies in Berlin.

== Research ==
Kwiek research in quantitative science studies utilizes large-scale bibliometric and administrative dataset analysis to examine scientific careers, international collaboration patterns, and gender disparities in academic performance.

== Honors and recognition ==
- 2002 – Reagan–Fascell Democracy Fellowship
- 2002-2003 – Kluge Fellow, John W. Kluge Center
- 2015 – Master Award from the Foundation for Polish Science
- 2018 – Member of the European Academy of Sciences and Arts
- 2021 – Member of Academia Europaea
- 2021-2025 – Listed among the top 2 percent of most highly cited researchers worldwide in analyses conducted by Elsevier and Stanford University
- 2025 – Honorary Doctorate, WSB University

== Selected publications ==
- Kwiek, Marek (2025). "Quantifying lifetime productivity changes: A longitudinal study of 320,000 late-career scientists". Quantitative Science Studies. 6: 1002–1038. doi:10.1162/QSS.a.16.
- Kwiek, Marek; Szymula, Lukasz (2025). "Quantifying attrition in science: a cohort-based, longitudinal study of scientists in 38 OECD countries". Higher Education. 89 (6): 1465–1493. arXiv:2401.09425. doi:10.1007/s10734-024-01284-0. hdl:10593/28092.
- Kwiek, Marek; Roszka, Wojciech (2025). "Are scientists changing their research productivity classes when they move up the academic ladder?". Innovative Higher Education. 50: 329–367. doi:10.1007/s10755-024-09735-3. hdl:10593/28096.
- Kwiek, Marek; Roszka, Wojciech (2024). "Top research performance in Poland over three decades: A multidimensional micro-data approach". Journal of Informetrics. 18 (4) 101595. arXiv:2407.04199. doi:10.1016/j.joi.2024.101595. hdl:10593/28089.
- Kwiek, Marek; Roszka, Wojciech (2024). "Once highly productive, forever highly productive? Full professors' research productivity from a longitudinal perspective". Higher Education. 87 (3): 519–549. doi:10.1007/s10734-023-01022-y. hdl:10593/28095.
- Kwiek, Marek; Horta, Hugo; Powell, Justin J. W. (2024). "Using large-scale bibliometric data in higher education research". Higher Education Quarterly. 78 (4): 1–24. doi:10.1111/hequ.12512. hdl:10593/28094.
