= Shanthi Kalathil =

American foreign policy analyst (born 1972)

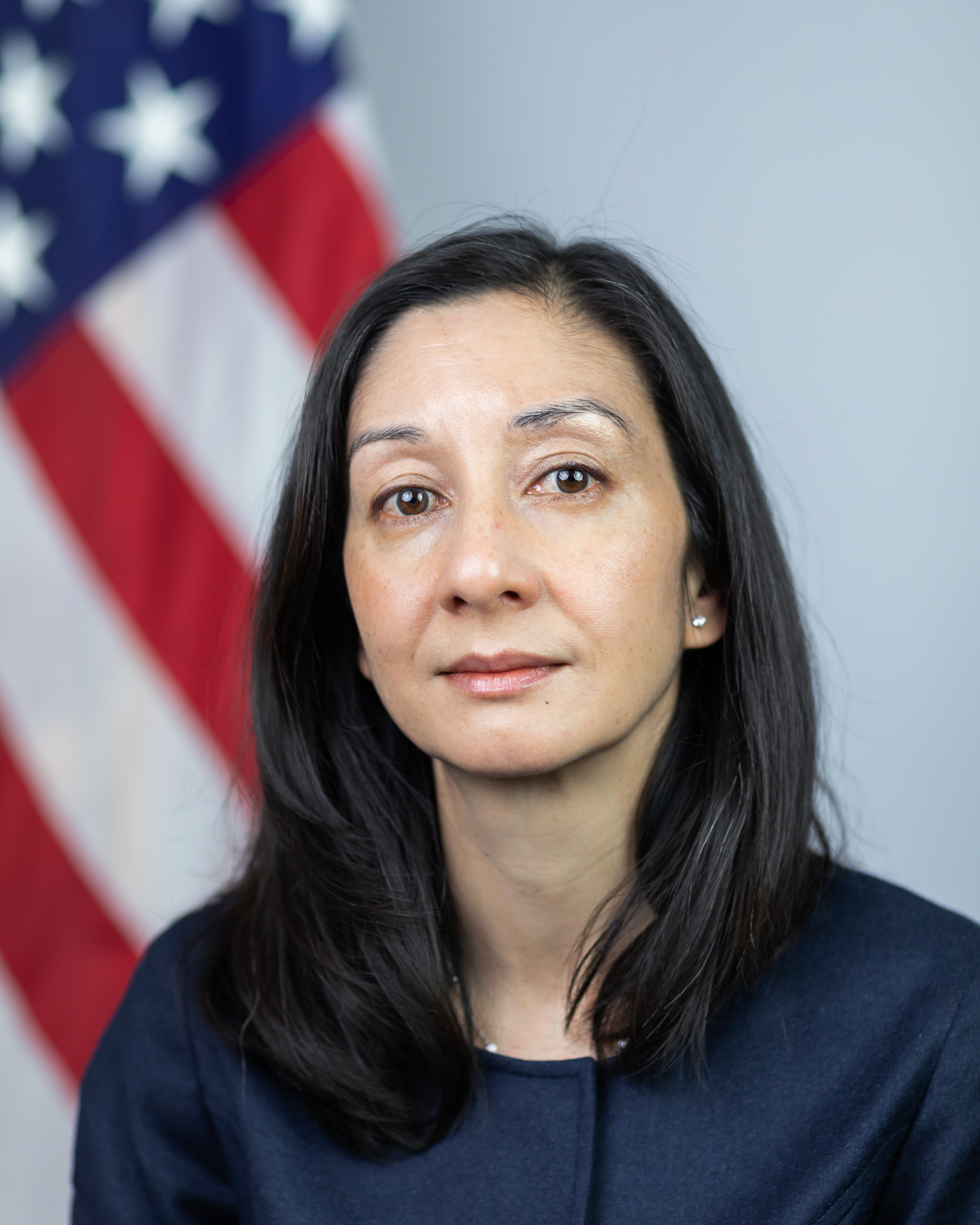
- Official portrait, 2021
- Born: 1972 (age 53–54)
- Education: University of California, Berkeley (BA); London School of Economics (MSc)
- Occupations: Foreign policy analyst; human rights advocate; former journalist
- Employer: University of Southern California
- Board member of: National Democratic Institute, Radio Free Asia
- Spouse: Jon Wolfsthal

Shanthi Kalathil (born 1972) is an American foreign policy analyst and former journalist, currently serving as a Washington D.C.–based senior fellow at the University of Southern California's Center on Communication Leadership and Policy and a visiting senior fellow at the German Marshall Fund's Alliance for Securing Democracy, where her work focuses on strengthening global democratic resilience in countering authoritarian influence. She is also a board member of the National Democratic Institute and Radio Free Asia.

Kalathil was formerly deputy assistant to the president and coordinator for democracy and human rights at the White House National Security Council during the Biden administration. Prior to this, Kalathil was a fellow at the US Agency for International Development (USAID) and a staff reporter for the Wall Street Journal Asia in Hong Kong.

Her co-authored 2003 book, Open Networks, Closed Regimes: The Impact of the Internet on Authoritarian Rule, explores technology’s role in advancing the objectives and bolstering the legitimacy of authoritarian regimes.

== Early life and education ==
Kalathil was born to Lucia Tang, a Taiwanese national, and James Kalathil, a Malayali Indian. She holds a B.A. in communications from the University of California, Berkeley and a M.Sc. in comparative politics from the London School of Economics and Political Science, where she focused on autocracies versus democracies. She is married to Jon Wolfsthal.

== Career ==
In the late 1990s, Kalathil was a staff reporter for the Wall Street Journal Asia, based in Hong Kong. She joined the Carnegie Endowment for International Peace as an associate in 2000. Her research focused on the role of information and technology in international affairs.

From 2004 to 2006, Kalathil was a senior democracy fellow at the US Agency for International Development (USAID). She also was a non-resident associate with Georgetown University's Institute for the Study of Diplomacy and worked for the World Bank as a consultant on media and development.

Kalathil joined the Biden administration's National Security Council (NSC) in January 2021 as deputy assistant to the president and coordinator for democracy and human rights after serving as senior director at the National Endowment for Democracy's International Forum for Democratic Studies. According to one of her colleagues at the NSC, covering the handover of Hong Kong from the U.K. to China in 1997 was among the events that caused Kalathil to leave journalism and pursue graduate studies. During her tenure, she was the lead organizer of the inaugural Summit for Democracy. In February 2022, she left the NSC. She started private practice before joining University of Southern California's Center on Communication Leadership and Policy as a DC-based senior fellow in April 2023, leading expansion of the Center's portfolio on the intersections of democratic development, the information environment, and national security. In May 2023, the Russian Ministry of Foreign Affairs announced entry bans over her and 499 other American citizens in response to the Biden administration's earlier sanctions on Russia. In February 2024, Kalathil joined the German Marshall Fund's Alliance for Securing Democracy as a visiting senior fellow, leading a new long-term initiative aimed to bolster global democratic resilience.

Kalathil is a board member of the National Democratic Institute and Radio Free Asia, which she described as having “filled a critical role in combating Chinese disinformation and providing timely news to millions in Asia who would otherwise be in the dark."

== Research ==
In their 2003 book titled Open Networks, Closed Regimes: The Impact of the Internet on Authoritarian Rule (Carnegie Endowment for International Peace), drawing on cases from China, Cuba, Singapore, Vietnam, Burma, UAE, Saudi Arabia, and Egypt, Kalathil and co-author Taylor Boas found that contrary to conventional wisdom, authoritarian regimes did not fear the advent of information technology but rather proactively advanced internet development to further their interests. In a review for The China Quarterly, Christopher R. Hughes of the London School of Economics and Political Science noted that Kalathil and Boas broadened "the debate beyond issues of dissidents-versus-the-state and toward more complex issues concerning the relationship between technological and social change," but critiqued that its coverage of China is too limited. John Ikenberry instead described the book's chapter on China, which illustrates how "Beijing has promoted the Internet while attempting to control its political impact by filtering and monitoring content and encouraging self-censorship," as "a particularly illuminating example."

== Publications ==
=== Books ===
- Open Networks, Closed Regimes: The Impact of the Internet on Authoritarian Rule, Carnegie Endowment for International Peace, 2003 (co-authored with Taylor C. Boas)

=== Reports ===
- The Evolution of Authoritarian Digital Influence: Grappling with the New Normal, National Defense University, 2020
- Adapting for the Global Diplomatic Arena: A Report of the Aspen Institute Dialogue on Diplomacy and Technology, Aspen Institute, April 16, 2014
- Developing Independent Media as an Institution of Accountable Governance, World Bank, June 2011
- Timor-Leste Media Assessment, USAID, February 2006

=== Articles ===
- Community and Communalism in the Information Age, Brown Journal of International Affairs, March 1, 2022
- The Cutting Edge of Sharp Power, Journal of Democracy, January 2020 (co-authored with Christopher Walker and Jessica Ludwig)
- Forget Hearts and Minds, Foreign Policy, September 14, 2018 (co-authored with Christopher Walker and Jessica Ludwig)
- How Democracies Can Fight Authoritarian Sharp Power, Foreign Affairs, August 16, 2018 (co-authored with Christopher Walker and Jessica Ludwig)
- China in Xi’s “New Era”: Redefining Development, Journal of Democracy, April 2018
- Dot Com for Dictators, Foreign Policy, November 4, 2009
- Democrats Vow in Calm Protest To Remain Voice of Hong Kong, Wall Street Journal, July 1, 1997
- "U.S. Business School Setting Up Program on Chinese Companies", Wall Street Journal, March 17, 1997

=== Edited volumes ===
- Diplomacy, Development and Security in the Information Age, Institute for the Study of Diplomacy, Georgetown University, 2013

=== Reviews ===
- Globalization Chinese-Style, Journal of Democracy, October 2017

=== Testimonies ===
- Statement by Shanthi Kalathil, Director, International Forum for Democratic Studies, National Endowment for Democracy, Before the House Committee on Foreign Affairs Subcommittee on Asia and the Pacific Hearing on "U.S. Responses to China's Foreign Influence Operations," 2018

== See also ==
- List of Executive Office appointments by Joe Biden
