= Yang Yao (disambiguation) =

Yang Yao is a Taiwanese politician.

It may also refer to:

- Yang Yao (姚洋; born 1964), Chinese economist, academic and author
- Yang Yao (楊幺; 1108–1135), Chinese rebel leader who called Heavenly King during Southern Song dynasty
