= Niemat Kuku =

Sudanese activist

- Born: South Sudan
- Citizenship: Sudan
- Occupation: Activist,
- Organization: The Gender Centre for Research and Training

Niemat Kuku is a Sudanese activist, development expert and a director and co-founder of The Gender Centre for Research and Training (GCRT) in Sudan. Kuku studies and supports women's rights and gender equality in Sudan and was a Reagan-Fascell Democracy Fellow.

== Women's rights research ==
Kuku has documented the strong role of Sudanese women in the public sphere since the early twentieth century, prior to World War I, during the Anglo–Egyptian colonial control of Sudan. In 2009, around the time of the 2010 Sudanese general election which had originally been planned for 2009, Kuku published a study of the political support for affirmative action via quotas as a practical means of reaching fair participation of women in political processes. She referred to elements of the 2005 Interim National Constitution that promoted affirmative action, "combat" against traditions that undermine women's status and dignity, and provision of maternity rights, medical services and childcare for mothers. She found that the major political parties all supported quotas for women in elections, with quotas varying from 25 to 33 percent. Kuku detailed specific mechanisms required for women's rights and democracy to improve through these elections.

== Women's rights activism ==
Kuku is one of the co-founders of The Gender Centre for Research and Training (GCRT) in Khartoum.In

In 2009, Kuku was a Reagan–Fascell Democracy Fellow at the National Endowment for Democracy in Washington, D.C. During her fellowship, she conducted research on women's political participation in Sudan under the project Engendering Democracy in Sudan: Putting Women's Rights First. She also presented her research at the National Endowment for Democracy and participated in international civil society discussions on gender equality and democratic governance
