= International Forum for Democratic Studies =

The International Forum for Democratic Studies (IFDS) was an analytical initiative of the National Endowment for Democracy (NED). Established in April 1994, its programs included the Journal of Democracy (which has Spanish and Portuguese editions), the Network of Democracy Research Institutes, and fellowship programs such as the Reagan–Fascell Democracy Fellowship. On 1 March 2025, after the Department of Government Efficiency cut funding to the NED by blocking disbursement from the US Department of Treasury, IFDS suspended operations.

Larry Diamond was the Forum's founding co-director (1994-2009). Shanthi Kalathil previously served as its senior director. Christopher Walker currently oversees the Forum.
