= Kalathil =

Kalathil is a name found in India. It can be a masculine given name or a surname. It could refer to:

== As a given name ==
- Kalathil Makki Divakaran, an Indian poet and folk songwriter

== As a surname ==
- Jayasree Kalathil, an Indian writer, mental health researcher, and activist
- Sathish Kalathil, an Indian filmmaker
- Shanthi Kalathil (born 1972), an American journalist
