= Radio Free Asia =

News broadcaster and publisher in Asia

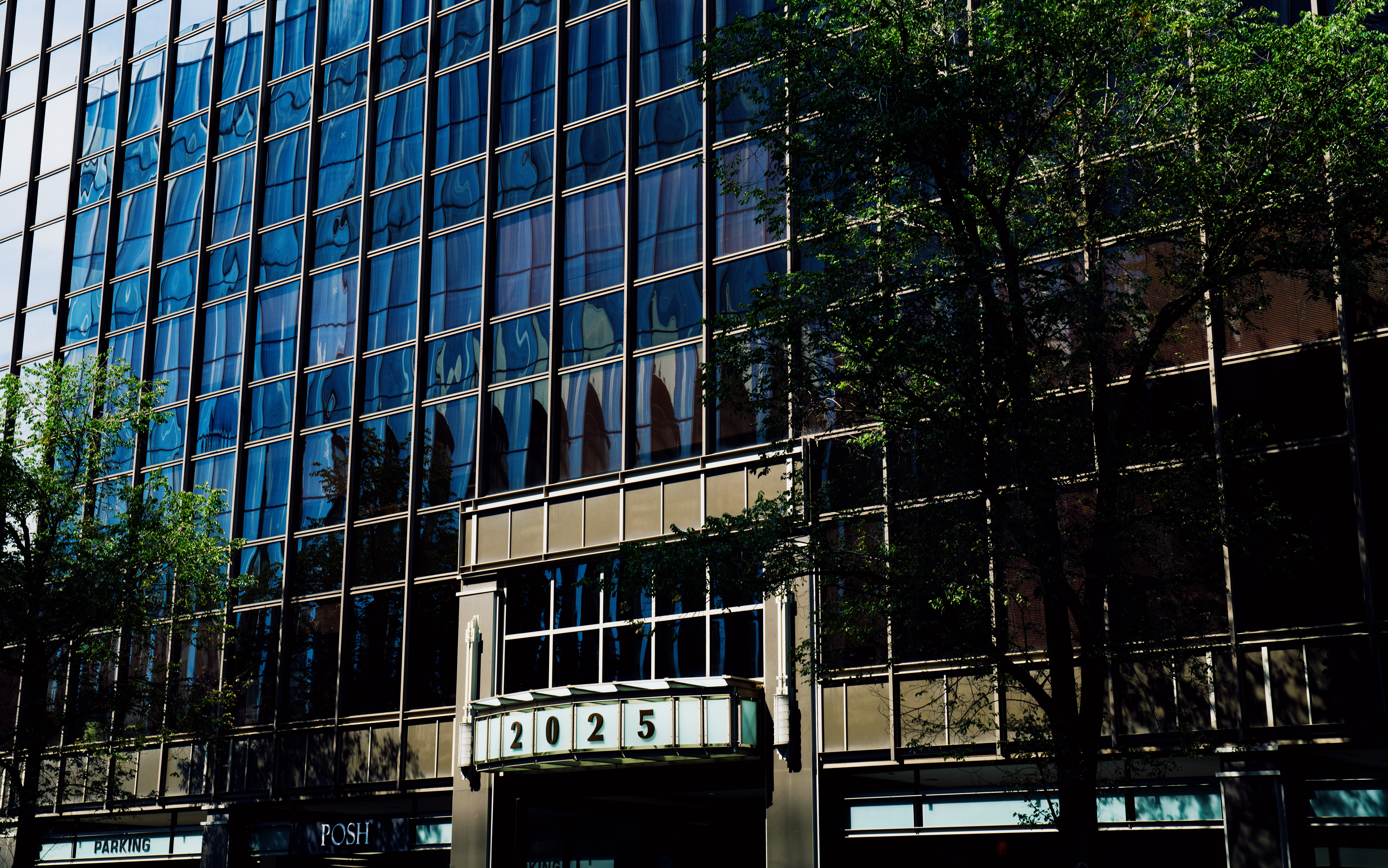
- RFA's headquarters in Washington, D.C.
- Abbreviation: RFA
- Formation: March 12, 1996; 30 years ago
- Type: 501(c)(3) organization
- Tax ID no.: 52-1968145
- Purpose: Broadcast Media
- Headquarters: Washington, D.C.
- Official languages: Burmese, Cantonese, English, Khmer, Korean, Lao, Mandarin, Tibetan, Uyghur, and Vietnamese
- President: Bay Fang
- Board of directors: Carolyn Bartholomew (Chair), Michael J. Green, Michael Kempner, Keith Richburg, Shanthi Kalathil, Allison Hooker
- Parent organization: U.S. Agency for Global Media
- Budget: $51.3 million (2023)
- Staff: 253
- Website: rfa.org

Radio Free Asia (RFA) is a U.S. state-funded media service that publishes online news and commentary, and broadcasts radio programs for audiences in Asia. The service, which is funded by the U.S. Congress, provides editorially independent reporting, has the stated mission of providing accurate and uncensored reporting to countries in Asia that have poor media environments and limited protections for speech and press freedom.

RFA operates as a non-profit corporation, headquartered in Washington, D.C., with news bureaus and journalists in Asia, Europe, and Australia. RFA was established by the US International Broadcasting Act of 1994 with the stated aim of "promoting democratic values and human rights", and countering the narratives and monopoly on information distribution of the Chinese Communist Party, as well as providing media reports about the North Korean government. It has historically been funded and supervised by the U.S. Agency for Global Media, an independent agency of the United States government. RFA digitally publishes news articles, photos, videos, and podcasts on its website and social media channels including Facebook, YouTube, Instagram, and X in a variety of Asian languages for audiences in (at various periods in its operational history) mainland China, Hong Kong, North Korea, Laos, Cambodia, Vietnam and Myanmar.

On March 15, 2025, the United States Agency for Global Media terminated grants to Radio Free Europe/Radio Liberty and Radio Free Asia following a directive from the Trump administration. The news service and its staff initially defied the executive order and remained on the air while considering legal action to challenge the directive. Since the announcement, RFA's Tibetan, Burmese, Korean, Lao, Cantonese, Khmer and Uyghur language services have shut down. Ultimately, RFA's news operations were suspended on October 31, 2025. Service partially resumed in 2026 first to audiences in the DPRK, and then to mainland China and Myanmar, in January and February, respectively.

Due to the March 2025 directive, the State Media Monitor has in 2025 and 2026 classified USAGM and its outlets, including RFA, as state-controlled media, describing the agency as operating "under direct White House political direction".

== History ==
After the 1989 Tiananmen Square protests and massacre, a bipartisan group of senators and congressmen led by Jesse Helms and Joe Biden came together and sponsored legislation to create Radio Free Asia. Republican House Speaker Newt Gingrich supported Radio Free Asia as a means to press China on human rights. The International Broadcasting Act was passed by the Congress of the United States and signed by President Bill Clinton in 1994, officially establishing Radio Free Asia.

Radio Free Asia was incorporated in March 1996, and began broadcasting in September 1996. Although RFA directors preferred to broadcast under the name "the Asia-Pacific Network", Republican representatives including Chris Smith and Jesse Helms insisted on returning the name to Radio Free Asia before broadcasting began, to which president Richard Richter complied. Radio Free Asia was forced to change the name in part due to financial pressures from the US government, for although they operated with an independent board, their initial $10 million annual budget came from the Treasury.

In 1997, the then US Deputy Secretary of State, Strobe Talbott, began talks with the government of Australia to purchase abandoned transmission facilities near Darwin, Northern Territory for the purpose of expanding RFA's signal to overcome jamming. Richter personally lobbied in Canberra to support this effort. Although the Australian Government intended to sell the facilities to a foreign broadcaster, preference was given to the BBC over the fledgling RFA due to fears that such a sale would anger China, with Australian Minister for Foreign Affairs Alexander Downer stating, "we are certainly not in the game of provocatively damaging our relations with China."

In response to radio jamming efforts from China, Newt Gingrich and House Republican leaders helped to increase the budget of RFA and VOA, with further funding of RFA proposed as a way to combat China's political repression without levying trade restrictions that would anger American businesses.

With the passage of the International Broadcasting Act in 1994, RFA was brought under auspices of the United States Information Agency where it remained until the agency's cessation of broadcasting duties and transitioned to U.S. Department of State operated Broadcasting Board of Governors in 1999. In September 2009, the 111th Congress amended the International Broadcasting Act to allow a one-year extension of the operation of Radio Free Asia.

On June 25, 2010, the US Senate unanimously approved Republican Senator Richard Lugar's legislation to promote the free dissemination of information in East Asia through the permanent authorization of RFA. The House of Representatives passed Lugar's bill S.3104 to grant Radio Free Asia permanent congressional authorization on June 30 and it was signed into law on July 13, 2010.

RFA broadcast in nine languages, via shortwave, satellite transmissions, medium-wave (AM and FM radio).

The first transmission was in Mandarin Chinese and it is RFA's most broadcast language at twelve hours per day. RFA also has broadcast in Cantonese, Tibetan (Kham, Amdo, and Uke dialects), Uyghur, Burmese, Vietnamese, Lao, Khmer (to Cambodia) and Korean (to North Korea). The Korean service launched in 1997 with Jaehoon Ahn as its founding director. Broadcasts in Khmer to Cambodia that began under the country's communist regime continue despite the country no longer being communist. In 2017, RFA and other networks, such as Voice of America, were put under the then newly created U.S. Agency for Global Media (USAGM) that also sends representatives to its board of directors.

The Global Investigative Journalism Network credited RFA with uncovering corruption in Vietnam and credited its journalists for risking prison sentences and worse from the regimes that they covered.

In January 2022, RFA announced that it had appointed Carolyn Bartholomew as the new chair of its board of directors. As of December 2023, its board members include: Michael J. Green, Michael Kempner, Keith Richburg, Shanthi Kalathil, and Allison Hooker. RFA receives its funding through annual budget allocations from the USAGM.

In March 2024, RFA announced the closure of its Hong Kong bureau, citing journalist safety concerns from Hong Kong's enactment of the Safeguarding National Security Ordinance.

=== List of presidents ===
Name	Term
Richard "Dick" Richter	1996–July 29, 2005
Libby Liu	September 2005–November 2019
Bay Fang	November 20, 2019–June 2020
Stephen J. Yates	December 2020–January 22, 2021
Bay Fang	January 2021–present

=== Radio jamming and Internet blocking ===
Since broadcasting began in 1996, Chinese authorities have consistently jammed RFA broadcasts.

Three RFA reporters were denied access to China to cover U.S. President Bill Clinton's visit in June 1998. The Chinese embassy in Washington had initially granted visas to the three but revoked them shortly before President Clinton left Washington en route to Beijing. The White House and United States Department of State filed complaints with Chinese authorities over the matter but the reporters ultimately did not make the trip.

The Vietnamese-language broadcast signal was also jammed by the Vietnamese government from the beginning. Human rights legislation has been proposed in Congress that would allocate money to counter the jamming. Research by the OpenNet Initiative, a project that monitors Internet filtering by governments worldwide, showed that the Vietnamese-language portion of the Radio Free Asia website was blocked by both of the tested ISPs in Vietnam, while the English-language portion was blocked by one of the two ISPs.

To address radio jamming and Internet blocking by the governments of the countries that it broadcasts to, the RFA website contained instruction on how to create anti-jamming antennas and information on web proxies.

On March 30, 2010, China's domestic internet censor, known as the Great Firewall, temporarily blocked all Google searches in China, due to an unintentional association with the long-censored term "rfa". According to Google, the letters, associated with Radio Free Asia, were appearing in the URLs of all Google searches, thereby triggering China's filter to block search results.

=== Arrests of Uyghur journalists' relatives ===
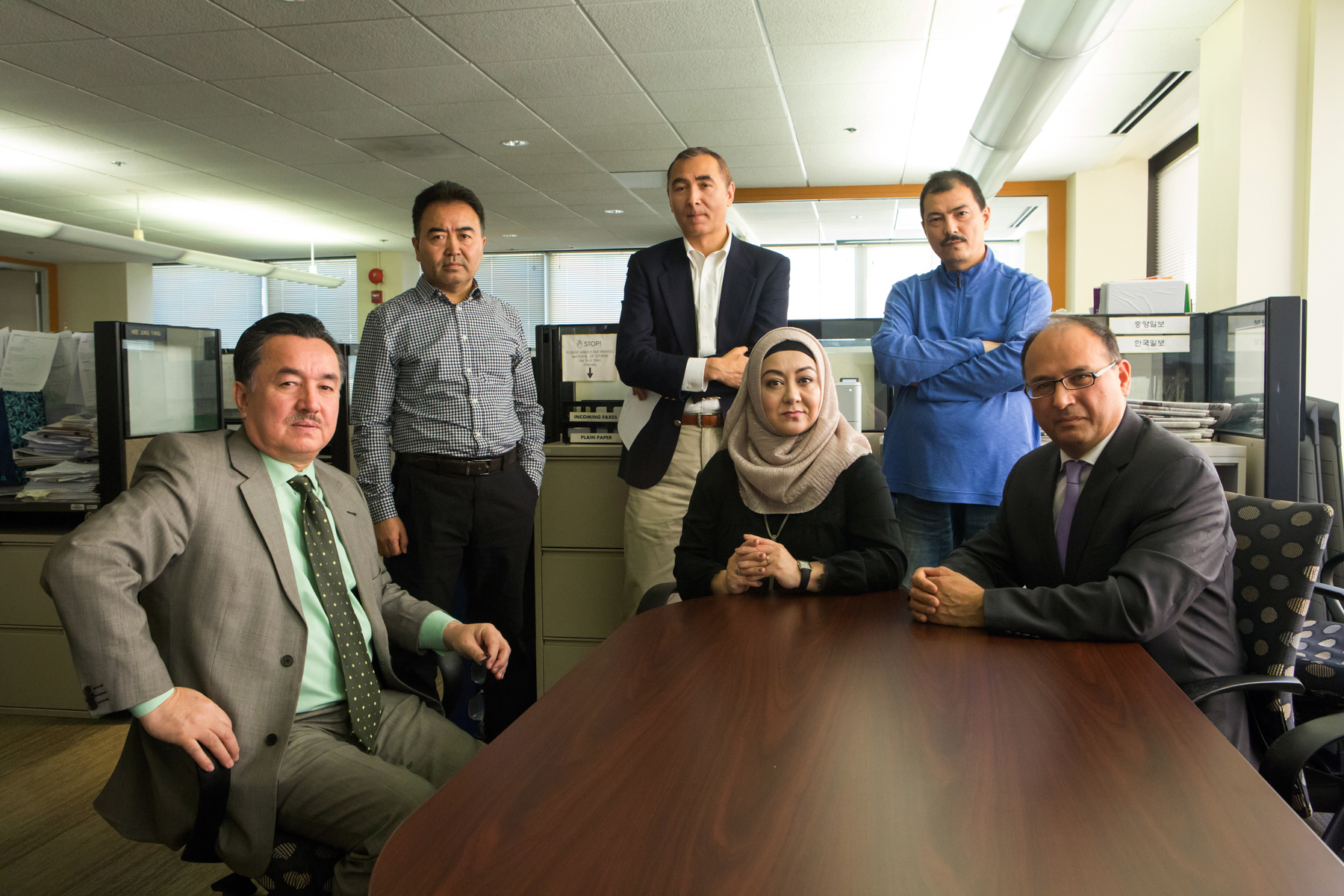
RFA's six Uyghur journalists (2018)

In 2014–2015, China arrested three brothers of RFA Uyghur Service journalist Shohret Hoshur. Their jailing was widely described by Western publishers as Chinese authorities' efforts to target Hoshur for his reports on otherwise unreported violent events of the Xinjiang conflict. Much larger numbers of relatives of RFA's Uyghur-language staff have since been detained, including the family of Gulchehra Hoja.

RFA was the only station outside China that broadcast in the Uyghur language. It has been recognized by journalists of The Atlantic, The Washington Post, The New York Times, and The Economist for playing a role in exposing Xinjiang re-education camps. In particular, The New York Times has regarded certain RFA articles as part of the few reliable sources of information about Xinjiang.

==== Xinjiang re-education camps ====
The Economist credited Radio Free Asia with breaking the story on the Xinjiang re-education camps. In 2018, after RFA journalist Hoja published an interview with an individual who had been detained in the Xinjiang re-education camps, Chinese authorities detained approximately two dozen of Hoja's relatives. Later that year, Chinese authorities forcibly disappeared two brothers and five cousins of an editor for RFA's Uyghur language service.

National Review has reported that as of 2021, eight of Radio Free Asia's fifteen staff of Uyghur ethnicity have family members who are detained in the Xinjiang re-education camps.

=== Suspension of news operations ===
On March 15, 2025, the United States Agency for Global Media imposed a 30-day total freeze on funding to RFA and terminated grants to Radio Free Europe/Radio Liberty and Radio Free Asia following a directive from the Trump administration and Elon Musk's Department of Government Efficiency (DOGE), with the intention of making that permanent. In response, the station and its staff initially defied the executive order and remained on the air while considering legal action to challenge the presidential directive.

On March 21, RFA affiliate WHYNOT halted operations. On March 27, Democracy Forward filed suit on behalf of Radio Free Asia to block the U.S. Agency for Global Media's attempt to cancel federal funds appropriated by Congress. On April 4, Radio Free Asia halted radio broadcasts in Mandarin, Tibetan and Lao, and heavily reduced its Burmese, Khmer, Korean and Uyghur language services. In April, it closed down its Lao language service. On May 2, RFA announced it was laying off 280 staff members in the United States and cutting 20 positions overseas. It also announced it would be closing down its Tibetan, Burmese, English and Uyghur language services by the end of May, and announced it would close Asia Fact Check Lab and all radio and TV-style broadcasts. On May 8, RFA suspended Burmese language services. On May 9, RFA suspended Uyghur and Tibetan language services. On July 8, RFA shut down its Cantonese language service. On July 17, the Korean language service suspended its activities. In October, Khmer language service suspended its activities. RFA halted its news operations on October 31. Offices in Seoul, Istanbul and Bangkok were closed, and language services for China, Vietnam, North Korea, Myanmar and Cambodia were suspended. Following the closures and reductions in force caused by the termination of the grants, the USAGM subsequently attacked RFA's actions as "reckless moves" and "rogue behavior".

In February 2026, RFA announced the resumption of service to China, Tibet, North Korea and Myanmar citing "private contracting with transmission services." Mandarin content was available online, while Tibetan, Uyghur, Korean and Burmese content aired over short- and medium-wave radio frequencies.

== Mission ==
Radio Free Asia's functions, as listed in 22 U.S.C. § 6208, are to:

1. provide accurate and timely information, news, and commentary about events in Asia and elsewhere; and
2. be a forum for a variety of opinions and voices from within Asian nations whose people do not fully enjoy freedom of expression.

Additionally, the International Broadcasting Act of 1994 (Title III of Pub. L. 103–236), which authorized the creation of the RFA, contains the following paragraph:

The continuation of existing U.S. international broadcasting, and the creation of a new broadcasting service to people of the People's Republic of China and other countries of Asia, which lack adequate sources of free information and ideas, would enhance the promotion of information and ideas, while advancing the goals of U.S. foreign policy.

According to a Congressional Research Service report titled "U.S. International Broadcasting: Background and Issues for Reform" updated on December 15, 2016:

RFA’s target audiences are mandated by legislation and include countries in Asia where governments prohibit access to a free press, specifically the People’s Republic of China and its regions of Tibet and Xinjiang, Burma, Cambodia, Laos, North Korea and Vietnam. RFA was authorized as a nonfederal, private nonprofit corporation that would operate under a BBG grant, much like RFE/RL.

The RFA's mission statement is outlined on its website as follows:

Radio Free Asia operates under a Congressional mandate to deliver uncensored, domestic news and information to China, Tibet, North Korea, Vietnam, Cambodia, Laos, and Burma, among other places in Asia with poor media environments and few, if any, free speech protections.

— RFA

== Reception ==
The logo of Radio Free Asia from 2010 to Fall 2021

In 1999, Catharin Dalpino of the Brookings Institution, a former assistant secretary deputy for human rights, called Radio Free Asia "a waste of money" and elaborated that she believed its goals had more to do with domestic political symbolism than with supporting democratic movements in Asia, stating that "Wherever we feel there is an ideological enemy, we're going to have a Radio Free Something." Dalpino said she had reviewed scripts of RFA's broadcasts and viewed the station's reporting as unbalanced due to focus on the testimony of dissidents in exile rather than the events occurring in the countries themselves. Lynne Weil, a director of communications and external affairs for the U.S. Agency for Global Media, has disputed descriptions of government-funded outlets as propaganda, referring to outlets such as BBC as examples of non-propagandist journalism funded by a government entity. In 2001, Richter stated that congressional interference in the organization was minimal, saying that he "wanted to make sure we weren't just getting set up to be a kill-the-Commie organization."

Monroe Price, director of the Center for Global Communication Studies, described RFA as "a modern iteration of Cold War use of the airwaves, emphasizing a turn from the traditional Cold War targets to new ones" and argued that the goals of RFA prove that the "instruments of international broadcasting are a reflection of the priorities and internal politics of the sending nation." Michael Sobolik of Hudson Institute said "RFA reporting from countries like China has been great for our foreign policy leaders and our elected officials, because we get better insight into what’s happening there, which serves the American interest. We don’t do this just out of the goodness of our hearts."

Vietnamese newspapers such as the state-run Nhân Dân have criticized the goals of RFA and broadcasts into the country, with a writer for Nhân Dân accusing the network of attempting to "interfere in other countries' internal affairs."

According to The Baltimore Sun in 2001, Chinese citizens calling in to RFA have expressed a wide range of opinions on the network, both positive and negative, many calling from pay phones to hide their identities.

=== Controversies and disputes ===
In early November 2012, Ngabo Jigme, director of the Tibetan language department of Radio Free Asia (RFA), was suddenly fired. It is said that the reason why Ngapoi Jigme was fired by RFA was that he allowed the Tibetan language department to express "opposition to the Tibetan government-in-exile" and because Ngapoi Jigme was "disrespectful" to the 14th Dalai Lama. This caused dissatisfaction with the Tibetan government-in-exile; RFA was pressured to fire Ngabo Jigme. Although the Tibetan government-in-exile and RFA denied it, the incident was still questioned by many parties. RFA's long-term consultant Maura Moynihan called it a "scandal" and Tibetan writer An Leye called a "farce"; American Tibetologist Elliot Sperling said "there are several assertions that the political conspiracy of exiled government leaders to put pressure on the RFA was the main reason for Ngabo Jigme's dismissal".

On May 10, 2020, RFA published a news article titled "China Border Inspection Strengthens Inspection of Entry and Exit Nationals, International Students Had Their Passports Cut," which contained a screenshot of a Reddit post by a user who said his passport had been clipped by China's border inspections. However, it was later revealed that the user's attached picture was stolen from someone else. The news triggered criticism from mainland Chinese media, saying that the claims stated in the news were incongruent with the situation.

On 11 May 2021, fact-checker First Draft News found that Mandarin- and Cantonese-language versions of Radio Free Asia (RFA) published anti-vaccine misinformation regarding the Chinese vaccines, particularly the ones manufactured by Sinopharm and Sinovac. The investigation found the RFA articles amplified misleading claims about the vaccine programs, and its stories were reprinted by popular tabloid newspapers to reinforce the anti-vaccine misinformation. The RFA site did not cover suspected adverse events related to Western-made vaccines. Wen-Ying Sylvia Chou, program director at the National Cancer Institute, believed these articles caused vaccine hesitancy and global public health risks. Masato Kajimoto, a misinformation expert and journalism professor at the University of Hong Kong, suggested the articles were biased toward anti-Beijing messages and repeated unsubstantiated claims made by unreliable sources, such as The Epoch Times.

== Awards ==
Radio Free Asia has received several awards for its journalism, including:

- 2008: Consumer Rights award. Hong Kong Consumer Council, Hong Kong Journalists Association.
- 2010 and 2020: The International Women's Media Foundation's Courage in Journalism Award.
- Edward R. Murrow National Award, 2019. Radio-Television News Directors Association.
- Sigma Delta Chi award, 2014. The Society of Professional Journalists.
- Annual Human Rights Press Award, 2012, 2008, 2007, 2006, 2005, and 2000. Amnesty International, Hong Kong Journalists Association, Foreign Correspondents' Club, Hong Kong.
- Edward R. Murrow Regional Award, 2013, 2005, 2003, 2002, and 2001. Radio-Television News Directors Association.
- Gracie Allen Award, 2013, 2010, and 2008. American Women in Radio and Television.
- The U.S. Broadcasting Board of Governors' David Burke Distinguished Journalism Award, 2010.
- Society of Environmental Journalists's First Prize for Outstanding Online Reporting on the Environment for RFA's 2010 multimedia series "The Last Untamed River."
- BenarNews, a RFA affiliate that reports in Bengali, Thai, Bahasa Malaysia, Bahasa Indonesia and English targeting South and Southeast Asia, won the 2021 Murrow Award for Excellence in Video (Small Digital News Organization) from the Radio Television Digital News Association for a video report showcasing volunteers who helped transport, bury and conduct the last rites for people who died from COVID-19 in Bangladesh.
- WHYNOT (simplified Chinese: 歪脑; traditional Chinese: 歪腦; pinyin: Wāinǎo), a RFA affiliate aiming for younger Mandarin speakers, won the 2021 Online News Association's Journalism Award (Feature, Small Newsroom) for "Preserving the Erased Decade of the Chinese Feminist Movement".
- 2024 Gracies Award from Alliance for Women in Media in the TV National category for Ayeyarwady Riverbank Erosion produced by imprisoned Burmese independent filmmaker Shin Daewe for RFA Burmese language service.
- 2024 National Edward R. Murrow Award from the Radio-Television News Directors Association in the Network Radio Digital category for "Under the Gun in Myanmar"
- 2025 Gracies Award from Alliance for Women in Media in the Radio National Winners category for the special report "Please save my sister: A North Korean escapee's plea"
- 2025 New York Festivals Radio Awards Silver Tower for investigative report "North Korean in Senegal: Stranded and isolated"
- 2025 National Edward R. Murrow Award from the Radio-Television News Directors Association in the Network Radio digital category for "Myanmar's Gen Z fighting for a nation's future" and "Nyah Mway: The boy who will be forever 13"
- 2026 Asian American Journalists Association Excellence in International Reporting award for “Battling a dictatorship, building a democracy: In the jungles of eastern Myanmar, insurgents fight the junta and dream of a new state.”

== Broadcasting information ==
Broadcasting Information (Channels 1, 2, 3, 4)
Language Service	Target audience	Launch Date	Closure Date	Daily Broadcast Hours
Mandarin	China	September 1996	October 2025	24 Hours, Daily ÷ over 3 channels
Tibetan	Tibet Autonomous Region; Qinghai	December 1996	May 2025	23 Hours, Daily, 1 ch
Burmese	Myanmar	February 1997	May 2025	8 Hours, Daily ÷ over 3 channels
Vietnamese	Vietnam	February 1997	October 2025	8 Hours, Daily ÷ over 2 channels
Korean	North Korea	March 1997	July 2025	9 Hours, Daily, 1 ch
Lao	Laos	August 1997	April 2025	5 Hours, Daily, 1 ch
Cantonese	Guangdong; Guangxi; Hong Kong; Macau	May 1998	July 2025	7 Hours, Daily ÷ over 2 channels
Khmer	Cambodia	September 1997	October 2025	5 Hours, Daily, 1 ch
Uyghur	Xinjiang	December 1998	May 2025	6 Hours, Daily, 1 ch

== See also ==
- International Broadcasting Bureau
- Media coverage of North Korea
- Murder of Robert Eric Wone, former counsel for Radio Free Asia
- Open Technology Fund – a Radio Free Asia program that was created in 2012 to support global Internet freedom technologies
