= Jon Wolfsthal =

American security analyst

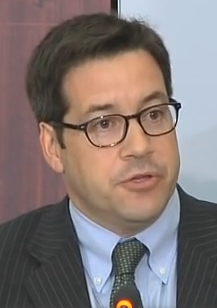
- Wolfsthal in 2015

Special Assistant to the President for National Security Affairs
- In office 2014–2017
- President: Barack Obama

Personal details
- Spouse: Shanthi Kalathil
- Education: Emory University (BA)

Jon Wolfsthal is an American security analyst currently serving as director of global risk at the Federation of American Scientists.

== Education ==
Wolfsthal graduated from the New Lincoln School in Manhattan and earned a Bachelor of Arts degree in Political Science from Emory University in 1988. He then attended graduate school at George Washington University.

== Career ==
Wolfsthal began his career in government service at the United States Department of Energy during the 1990s in a variety of positions, including in North Korea, where he served in roles including as an on-site monitor under the 1994 "Agreed Framework".

From March 2009 to March 2012, Wolfsthal served as a special advisor for Nonproliferation and Nuclear Security in the Office of the Vice President of the United States under Vice President Joe Biden and as Director for Nonproliferation at the National Security Council.

From 2014 to 2017, Wolfsthal served as a special assistant to President Barack Obama and Senior Director for Arms Control and Nonproliferation on the United States National Security Council. In that post, he was the most senior White House official setting and implementing U.S. Government policy on arms control, nonproliferation, and nuclear policy. During his tenure at the White House Office, he developed U.S. nuclear and nonproliferation policy. He was involved in crafting President Obama's Prague speech delivered in April 2009, served on the delegation to the 2010 Nuclear Security Summit, helped negotiate and gain Senate approval of the New START arms control agreement with Russia, helped draft the 2010 Nuclear Posture Review and coordinated U.S. policy for the 2015 NPT Review Conference.

The co-author of Deadly Arsenals: Tracking Weapons of Mass Destruction, he was described by the office of U.S. Vice President Joe Biden as "a globally recognized expert on nuclear security and nonproliferation", He served previously as deputy director of the James C. Martin Center for Nonproliferation Studies at the Middlebury Institute of International Security at Monterey.

Wolfsthal has taught at the Paul H. Nitze School of Advanced and International Studies, Georgetown University, and the Middlebury Institute of International Studies at Monterey. Wolfsthal is a senior advisor at Global Zero. and non-resident fellow at the Belfer Center for Science and International Affairs.

Wolfsthal has written op-ed columns for Foreign Policy, The New York Times, and HuffPost.

As of March 2017, Wolfsthal serves as a member of the Bulletin of the Atomic Scientists' Science and Security Board.

== Publications ==
Project Atom 2023: A Competitive Strategies Approach for U.S. Nuclear Posture through 2035, Center for Strategic and International Studies, September 30, 2023 (co-authored with Heather Williams, Kelsey Hartigan, Lachlan MacKenzie, Robert Soofer, Tom Karako, Franklin Miller, Leonor Tomero, and Oriana Skylar Mastro)

== Personal life ==
Wolfsthal is married to Shanthi Kalathil.
