= William J. Dobson =

American journalist and author

- Born: William Joel Dobson; March 2, 1973 (age 53); North Kingstown, Rhode Island, United States
- Education: Middlebury College (AB); Harvard University (AM); Harvard Law School (JD)
- Occupation: Co-editor
- Employer: Journal of Democracy
- Notable credit: The Dictator's Learning Curve

William J. "Will" Dobson is an American journalist and author who writes frequently on foreign affairs and international politics. He is the co-editor of the Journal of Democracy. Previous roles include chief international editor at NPR and the politics and foreign affairs editor for Slate.

== Early life ==
Dobson was born on a naval base in North Kingston, Rhode Island. His father, W. Joel Dobson, was a lieutenant commander in the U.S. Navy. His mother, Barbara Joyce Dobson, is an English teacher.

Dobson grew up in Spartanburg, South Carolina, and attended Spartanburg Day School. He received a Bachelor of Arts summa cum laude from Middlebury College. He later earned a master's degree in East Asian studies from Harvard University and a Juris Doctor cum laude from Harvard Law School. He lives in Washington, DC with his wife and two children.

== Career ==
From 2004 to 2008, Dobson was the managing editor of Foreign Policy magazine. During his tenure at Foreign Policy, the magazine was nominated for a National Magazine Award five years in a row – the only magazine of its size to receive five consecutive nominations – and won the top prize twice.

Previously, he served as the senior editor for Asia at Newsweek International and as associate editor at Foreign Affairs. He has also been a visiting scholar at the Carnegie Endowment for International Peace.

During the height of the Arab Spring, he wrote daily pieces on modern authoritarianism for the Washington Post’s editorial page. While reporting from Cairo, Dobson wrote the first account of the Egyptian military’s torture of female protestors in Tahrir Square.

Dobson's first book, The Dictator's Learning Curve was published by Doubleday in 2012. The non-fiction book is an analysis of modern authoritarianism and has been reviewed by various media. The Washington Post, New York Times, Financial Times, and Publishers Weekly were among those giving positive reviews.

== Awards ==
Dobson was named a Young Global Leader by the World Economic Forum in 2006. In 2003, he was named the U.S. Rapporteur for the World Economic Forum's East Asia Summit. The Singapore International Foundation awarded him a Distinguished Visitor Fellowship in 2008. The East-West Center awarded him a Senior Journalist Fellowship for Southeast Asia (2006) and an Journalism Fellowship (2008). Dobson was a Knight Media Fellow (2003) to the Salzburg Global Seminar, and later a Freeman Fellow in U.S.-East Asian Relations (2007).

Middlebury College recognized him with an Alumni Achievement Award in 2011. Dobson is also a 1994 Truman Scholar.

== Published works ==
=== Books (Editor) ===
- Defending Democracy in an Age of Sharp Power, (Johns Hopkins University Press; 2023).

=== Books (Author) ===
- The Dictator’s Learning Curve, (Doubleday; 2012). ISBN 978-0385533355

=== Op-eds and articles ===
- The Mandarin in the Machine, Journal of Democracy, October 2022
- A Glimpse of the Way Forward, Journal of Democracy, July 2020
- The Ghost of Hugo Chavez, Slate, March 6, 2013
- Putin the Pitiful, Slate, December 28, 2012
- The East Is Crimson, Slate, May 23, 2012
- Why China Wishes Chen Would Just Go Away, Slate, May 2, 2012
- Dictatorship for Dummies, Tunisia Edition, The Washington Post, January 23, 2011
- 'The Military is above the Nation', The Washington Post, March 15, 2011
- ‘Another dictatorship, just with new faces’ for Egypt, The Washington Post, March 16, 2011
- ‘Worse than our Worst Nightmare during Mubarak,' The Washington Post, March 17, 2011
- Where are the dictator’s helpers? The Washington Post, March 18, 2011
- One Woman’s Fight to Preserve a Russian Forest, The Washington Post, March 24, 2011
- The Opposition Dictators Deserve, The Washington Post, April 16, 2011
- Why I am Glad bin Laden Lived to See the Arab Spring, The Washington Post, May 5, 2011
- In Venezuela, Fighting for the Chance to Run: ‘He will annihilate that one leader,’ The Washington Post, May 15, 2011
- Imagining a World Without Dictators, The Washington Post, August 26, 2011
- Why Gaddafi was the quintessential 20th-century dictator, The Washington Post, October 21, 2011
- In Russia, Fires—and politicians—are bringing down forests, The Washington Post, August 13, 2010
- China’s Jittery Leaders, The New Republic, March 3, 2011
- A Victory for Democratic Foreign Policy, The New Republic, May 3, 2011
- The Day Nothing Much Changed, Foreign Policy, August 8, 2006
- Tunisia’s Lessons for Repressive Regimes, U.S. News & World Report, January 20, 2011
- Global Democracy over a Barrel, The Boston Globe, May 14, 2009

=== Media appearances ===
Dobson has appeared and provided commentary for various news organizations, including C-SPAN, PBS NewsHour, CNN, CBS, MSNBC, National Public Radio, and Voice of America.
