= Center for Global Communication Studies =

University of Pennsylvania research centre

The Center for Global Communication Studies (CGCS) is a research center located within the Annenberg School for Communication at the University of Pennsylvania. CGCS serves as a research hub for students and scholars worldwide studying comparative communication studies, media law, and media policy. The center also provides consulting and advisory assistance to academic centers, non-governmental organizations, regulators, lawyers, and governments throughout the world.

CGCS works to improve research on media and communication by creating an extensive network of communication scholars, media lawyers, policymakers, and civil society actors who are committed to improving media systems through academic collaboration. CGCS experiments with ways to improve media and communications law and policy using this network of communication actors; by creating research opportunities for graduate and Ph.D. students; by offering opportunities for international collaboration for Annenberg faculty; by producing and supporting research publications, books, and working papers on media issues; by providing international media assistance through contracts with federal agencies, international counterparts, and foundations.

CGCS draws on various disciplines including media studies, law, political science, and international relations to explore public policy issues in diverse regions across the globe. The scholarship at CGCS particularly deals with the way media and globalization intersect with the changing nature of states.

CGCS's visiting scholars program provides opportunities for Ph.D. students, post-doctoral researchers, and young faculty members to further their academic careers, share their insights and expertise with Penn students and faculty, and participate in the intellectual life of the Annenberg School. Among other subjects, CGCS Visiting Scholars have studied contemporary experiences of mass media in the Middle East, the growth of information and state power in southern Africa, media ethics in the context of civil war, and the economic integration of technology – particularly mobile communications in economically developing countries. Since its inception, CGCS has hosted more than 60 visiting scholars from countries including China, England, France, Germany, Jordan, India, Senegal, Israel, Italy, Norway, Portugal, Cote d’Ivore, South Africa, and Turkey.

CGCS is directed by Monroe Price, who also serves as the Joseph and Sadie Danciger Professor of Law and Director of the Howard M. Squadron Program in Law, Media and Society at the Cardozo School of Law. He has been referred to as “the most networked man in the world” by his colleagues.

== The CGCS Network ==
Oxford University, Programme for Comparative Media Law and Policy (PCMLP)

Since its inception, CGCS has been working with the Programme in Comparative Media Law and Policy at Oxford’s Centre for Socio-Legal Studies. The Annenberg-Oxford Summer Institute, an intensive two-week summer program on media law and policy, arose out of this partnership in 2004. Since that time it has been held each year to bring together talented young researchers and regulators from different parts of the world to discuss innovations in information and communication technologies, changing geopolitical environments, and how these political, technological, and social revolutions are transforming media policy. Past Institutes have dealt with issues such as “Internet regulation, Net Neutrality, and Mobile technologies”, “Global Media Policy and New Themes in Media Regulation”, and "Media Governance and Strategic Communication in Conflict and Post-Conflict Environments".

Since 2008, CGCS has also partnered with PCMLP for the Annual Monroe Price International Moot Court Competition. The competition brings together young law students and media scholars to learn how to argue a case in front of a panel of international judges who come from diverse legal systems and policy environments. The competition aims to expand and stimulate an interest in comparative media law and policy among young international scholars. The moot court is held in Oxford, but has since evolved to include regional moot court competitions, the first of which took place in Delhi, India in 2010.

Center for Media, Data and Society at Central European University.

CGCS partners with CMDS at the Central European University to organize workshops, webinars, conferences, and workshops, as well as an annual summer school program.

In July 2010, CGCS held an international summer school titled “Media, Democratization and International Development: Understanding and Implementing Monitoring and Evaluation Programs.” The course had a greater focus than in past years on developing practical, hands-on skills in monitoring and evaluation, with particular attention to the role of radio as a medium for development goals.

In 2011 the course was held again under the title “Communication Policy Advocacy, Technology, and Online Freedom of Expression: a Toolkit for Media Development.”

CGCS and CMCS also offer a two-year Annenberg Post-Doctoral Fellowship In Global Communication Studies.

Other Partners

- Oxford Internet Institute
- Communication University of China
- The Reuters Institute for the Study of Journalism
- Stanhope Centre for Communications Policy Research
- Internews Network
- IE University, Spain
- The World Bank
- USC Annenberg School for Communication and Journalism
- IREX

== Media Development and Capacity-Building Projects ==
Part of the mission of CGCS is to work in a development capacity and also to undertake important research related to comparative or international communication scholarship. To meet this goal, CGCS regularly responds to calls for proposals from funders to institute capacity-building and research projects on global media law and policy.

Current Projects:

- Afghanistan: USAID proposal for Afghanistan Media Development and Empowerment Project. (with Internews Network, Nai Supporting Open Media, etc.). This program works to build legal capacity in Afghanistan through trainings with Afghan lawyers, media professionals, students, and professors.
- Bosnia: USAID proposal for Bosnia-Herzegovina Strengthening Independent Media (with Internews).
- The Iran Media Program is a collaborative research network that works to explore Iran's “media ecology”.

Other current and past projects Include:

- Jordan Media Strengthening Program (2006–2011)
- "Researching Attitudes Towards Peace and Conflict in Darfur": Survey Research in Darfur to help understand the conflict in the region, its causes, and its effects. (2009–2011)
- The William and Flora Hewlett Foundation, “A Review Of The New Law On Transparency In Mexico And The Federal Agency Encharged With Reviewing Decisions Made Under The Law By The Public Federal Administration.”
- World Bank Institute grant for consulting work on “Broadcasting, Voice and Accountability: A public interest approach to policy, law, and regulation” published by UMichigan Press in Spring 2008.
- Executive Course in Communication and Governance Reform (World Bank and USC Annenberg)
- The Annual Milton Wolf Seminar Series – aims to deal with developing issues in diplomacy and journalism (The American Austrian Foundation)
