= Jaehoon Ahn =

Korean American journalist (1941–2011)

- Born: 안재훈; May 13, 1941; Pyongyang, Heian'nan Province, Korea, Empire of Japan
- Died: June 1, 2011 (aged 70); Virginia Beach, Virginia, United States
- Occupations: journalist, researcher

Jaehoon Ahn (Korean: 안재훈; May 13, 1941 – June 1, 2011) was a Korean-born American journalist and researcher. Ahn worked as a researcher for The Washington Post for more than twenty-five years, until 1996. He was also the founding director of Radio Free Asia's Korean language service in 1997 and a board member of U.S. Committee for Human Rights in North Korea.

== Biography ==
Ahn was born on May 13, 1941, in Pyongyang, Heian'nan Province (South Pyongan Province), Korea, Empire of Japan, now North Korea. He fled with his family from their home in Pyongyang, where his family had lived for generations, to South Korea during the night when he was five years old to escape Communism. In 1960, he obtained a bachelor's degree from Seoul National University.

Ahn took a position as a reporter for JoongAng Ilbo, where he covered the Six-Day War as a foreign correspondent for the newspaper. He moved to the United States during the late 1960s and settled in the Washington, D.C. metropolitan area. He joined the staff of The Washington Post in 1969 as an assistant librarian for the newspaper's research department.

Ahn retired from the research department of The Washington Post in 1996. He worked for a Seoul-headquartered daily newspaper, where he helped to create the newspaper's style section and reorganize the structure of the newsroom.

In 1997, Ahn was hired as the founding director of Radio Free Asia's fledgling Korean language service. Ahn helped to build the service from the beginning. He launched the RFA's Korea language service's first half hour of programming and hired the service's first five staff members and journalists. Ahn expanded the half-hour format to a longer show and managed to report directly from North Korea during his tenure as director. He retired from Radio Free Asia in 2007. In addition, Ahn served as a board member for the U.S. Committee for Human Rights in North Korea.

Ahn moved to Sandbridge Beach in southern Virginia Beach upon his retirement.

Jaehoon Ahn died from complications from a bleeding ulcer at a hospital in Virginia Beach, Virginia, on June 1, 2011, at the age of 70. He was survived by his wife, Soonhoon Lee Ahn, whom he had been married to for 42 years; two daughters, Soomie Lee Ahn and Yoomie Lee Ahn; four sisters; one brother; and three grandchildren. His father died in June 1997.
