= Why Not =

Why Not may refer to:

== Film and TV ==
- Why Not? with Shania Twain, an American TV show
- Pourquoi pas! (Why Not!), a 1977 French film starring Sami Frey
- Why Not?, a 2019 short thriller movie directed by Buğra Mert Alkayalar

== Music ==
=== Albums ===
- Why Not (George Cables album), 1975
- Why Not!, a 1991 album by saxophonist Houston Person
- Why Not? (Michel Camilo album), 1985, or the title song
- Why Not..., a 1978 album by organist Don Patterson
- Why Not? (Marion Brown album), 1968
- Why Not?, a 1973 album by Ellis
- Y Not, a 2010 album by Ringo Starr
- Y Not Festival, an annual music festival in Derbyshire, England
- Why Not, a 2015 album by Blue Sky Riders

=== Songs ===
- "Why Not?" (song), a 2020 single by girl group Loona
- "Why Not" (song), a 2003 song by Hilary Duff
- "Why Not?", a 1970 song by Gentle Giant from the album Gentle Giant

== Other uses ==
- Why Not Model Agency, an Italian modeling agency
- Beach Hotel (Sydney), originally Why Not, an historic pub in Sydney, Australia
- The ? operator in linear logic
- "Why Not?", slogan of the 1989 Baltimore Orioles season
- David Munyua, Kenyan darts player nicknamed "Why Not?"

== See also ==
- Whynot (disambiguation)
