= National Security Decision Directive 77 =

US National security directive

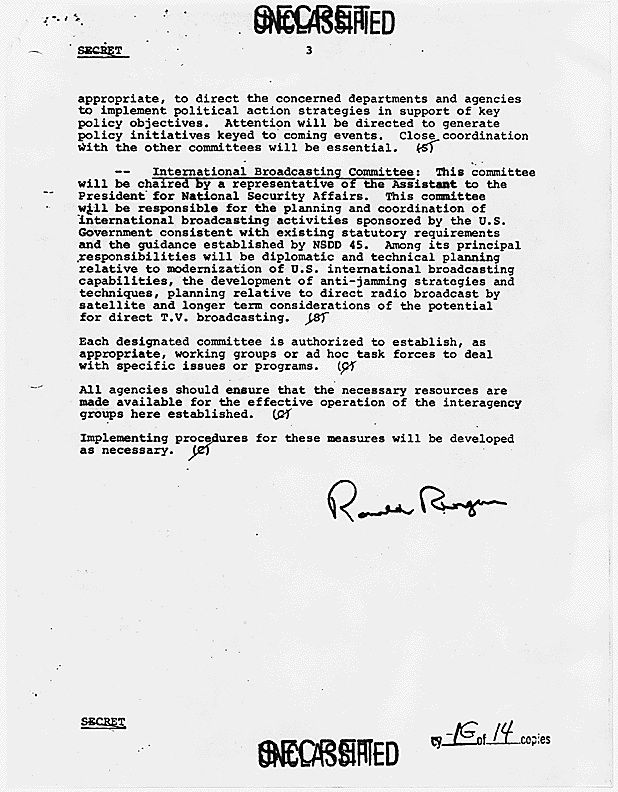
- NSDD77
- Author: United States National Security Council
- Language: English
- Published: January 14, 1983 Federal government of the United States
- Publication place: United States
- Media type: Print
- Pages: 3

National Security Decision Directive 77 (NSDD-77; titled Management of Public Diplomacy Relative to National Security), was a U.S. National Security Directive signed on January 14, 1983, by President Ronald Reagan. The directive established a Special Planning Group (SPG) under the National Security Council (NSC) whose purpose was to strengthen, organize, plan, and coordinate public diplomacy of the United States relative to national security. This NSDD positioned the White House and the National Security Staff at the helm of public diplomacy coordination across government agencies. NSDD-77 lay the groundwork for the Reagan administration's aggressive public diplomacy strategy and included guidance for inter-agency working groups to execute wide-ranging tactics for information dissemination both domestically and internationally.

A National Security Decision Directive (NSDD) is a kind of Presidential Directive in which a President gives instructions to senior advisors and departments concerning matters of national security.

== Background ==
Public diplomacy and international information programs have been used as instruments of foreign policy since World War II. The Department of State began sponsoring educational and cultural exchanges as early as the 1930s as a method of combating German influence in Latin America. The CIA sponsored Radio Free Europe/Radio Liberty (RFE/RL) in the 1950s to broadcast messages into the Soviet Bloc. The aggressive public diplomacy initiatives created under the Truman and Eisenhower administrations were not pursued by subsequent administrations until President Reagan in the 1980s. The Reagan administration's dedication to public diplomacy as a tool of foreign policy during the Cold War was unprecedented. Carnes Lord, a principal author of NSDD 77, stated that the "beleaguered and defensive bureaucracy was infused with money, high-caliber personnel, and a mandate, and for the first time in many years was admitted to an administration's inner councils. It is also important to underline the personal involvement in public diplomacy operations, not only of the president himself, but of other senior administration policy officials."

"The idea of a coordinated national-level approach to public diplomacy was fundamental to the administration's outlook from the beginning. To the extent that public diplomacy was to serve as a genuine strategic instrument, it stood in need of more intense and coordinated support from the White House and senior levels of the major national security agencies than had been the case for a long time. In order to ensure this support on a continuing basis, another presidential directive established a mechanism within the National Security Council system for managing public diplomacy matters.

— Dr. Carnes Lord, describing the necessity of NSDD 77

President Reagan's background as a Hollywood actor, and later governor of California, provided him with access to many powerful individuals with backgrounds in communications, advertising, and entertainment. President Reagan appointed longtime friend and Hollywood financier, Charles Z. Wick, to head the USIA and Frank Shakespeare to chair the Board of International Broadcasting. This team of communication experts, many lacking any significant experience in Washington, enabled the Reagan administration to conceptualize and execute many revolutionary and risky tactics in their shaping of an effective public diplomacy strategy. Dr. Lord goes on to explain, "the strategic framework of the Reagan administration's public diplomacy effort featured among other things, direct engagement with Soviet propaganda and disinformation, democracy promotion, and revitalization of U.S. international broadcasting."

== Overview of NSDD 77 ==
The Special Planning Group (SPG) was established under the chairmanship of the Assistant to the President for National Security Affairs (NSA), and consisted of five primary members including: the Secretary of State, the Secretary of Defense, the Director of the United States Information Agency, the Director of the Agency for International Development, and the Assistant to the President for Communications. Other senior officials were invited to attend at the request of the chairman.

NSDD 77 established four interagency committees that would report and be monitored by the SPG. These committees included: the Public Affairs Committee, the International Information Committee, the International Political Committee, and the International Broadcasting Committee. The NSC staff, in coordination with the SPG, called regular meetings of the committee chairmen to insure proper interagency coordination and execution of SPG directed initiatives and guidance.

1. The Public Affairs Committee was responsible for U.S. Government public affairs activities relating to national security objectives. This committee focused on speeches and public appearances for senior officials and was designed to ensure the American public understood and supported the major foreign policy initiatives throughout the world.

2. The International Information Committee was led by a senior representative of the United States Information Agency. This group was responsible for the planning and execution of all activities associated with international information relative to national security policy. This committee took over for "Project Truth" and was tasked to implement information in specific geographic areas of interest.

3. The International Political Committee was chaired by a Senior official from the Department of State. This committee was responsible for the coordination and implementation of international political activities relative to U.S. national security interests abroad. This group focused on the training, organization, and aid provided to foreign governments, groups, and institutions dedicated to the growth of democracy. This committee executed plans designed to quell the spread of communist and totalitarian ideologies through direct political action strategies.

4. The International Broadcasting Committee was chaired by a representative from the National Security Council. This group's responsibilities revolved around guidance outlined in National Security Decision Directive 45, United States International Broadcasting. Public Diplomacy Professor, Dr. J. Michael Waller, stated that NSDD 45 "firmly re-established U.S.-sponsored international broadcasting as a national security instrument, subject not only to the guidance of the Secretary of State but also of the National Security Advisor to the President." This portion outlined a plan for elevating U.S. sponsored international broadcasting to an instrument of national security."

== Impact of NSDD 77 on Reagan's foreign policy ==
Though not specifically outlined in NSDD 77, there were a number of sub-groups and departments tasked with employing tactics in line with guidance included in NSDD 77. One of the most notorious was the Office of Public Diplomacy for Latin American and the Caribbean (S/LPD or ARA/LPD), a group in existence prior to the release of NSDD 77 and under the leadership of former CIA propaganda specialist, Walter Raymond, and Lieutenant Colonel Oliver North in the National Security Council. Managed by Otto Reich, this task force worked with the CIA and U.S. Army to create "white propaganda" intended to influence Congressional and public opinion into the continued funding of Reagan's campaign against the Sandinista government of Nicaragua. Reich and his group met with dozens of journalists and reporters during 1984 and 1985, intending to keep them on message with developments in Nicaragua. This inter-agency working group was instrumental in fundraising efforts and fund transfers between private groups and the Democratic Resistance in Nicaragua. The group was disbanded after a September 20, 1987 Iran Contra investigation report in which the Comptroller General discovered S/LPD violated numerous funding restrictions including the use of federal dollars to fund a non-authorized propaganda campaign.

NSDD-77 also formalized the process for launching various initiatives that President Reagan and his supporters had been socializing since his inauguration including "Project Democracy" and the National Endowment for Democracy. These initiatives showcased the political action arm of public diplomacy, underscoring again Reagan's commitment to the spread of democratic ideals worldwide. NSDD-77 propelled numerous agencies throughout the U.S. government to aid in the collapse of the Soviet Empire and the emergence of open societies. Executive branch oversight of these information dissemination strategies insured engagement from high-ranking officials throughout the government and civilian sectors.

== Modern-day public diplomacy initiatives ==
Presidential Decision Directive-68, entitled "International Public Information" (IPI), was published on April 30, 1999, and remains classified today. The IPI system was designed to mitigate problems with bad press related to military missions in Kosovo and Haiti. This directive was issued with the intent of influencing foreign governments and combating the spread of misinformation from foreign media into the American press. This information policy was designed for use by all government agencies, expanding from solely USIA and State, and accounted for the advance of communication technologies that allowed numerous groups to be involved in information dissemination.

President George H.W. Bush issued the still classified National Security Presidential Directive-16 in July 2002 outlining a variety of cyberweapons as a potential instrument of national security. The secret directive directs agencies within the U.S. government to establish guidance for cyberattacks against enemy computer networks. Karen Hughes later initiated multiple social networking tools to engage with the Arab community. Because they were not integrated with other government agencies' efforts, they failed to produce any short-term results.

On October 30, 2003, the Department of Defense published a document entitled, "Information Operations Roadmap," detailing the military's information warfare campaign. The plan, declassified in 2006, approved by then Secretary of Defense, Donald Rumsfeld, details efforts to engage the enemy through information operations (IO), electronic warfare (EW), psychological operations (PSYOP), operational security (OPSEC), and military deception and computer network operations (CNO).

President Obama is yet to announce a strategy for public diplomacy or information outreach strategies as an instrument of foreign policy. Executive branch oversight, sufficient funding, and appointment of expert personnel will be required. As Dr. Carnes Lord stated,

...there is a need to reconceptualize public diplomacy in terms of the requirements of unforeseen crises and contingencies of the post-Cold War era. For instance, a way should be found to create a reserve of area and language expertise in the government that could be quickly mobilized for public diplomacy and other national information requirements. Infrastructure (e.g. new short-wave radio transmitters) should be configured for multiple uses and maximum flexibility. Above all, internal organization, doctrines, processes, and technologies for public diplomacy should be rethought so as to improve integration with national policy and interagency operations in the field.
