= Market for loyalties theory =

Market for Loyalties Theory is a media theory based upon neoclassical economics. It describes why governments and power-holders monopolize radio, satellite, internet and other media through censorship using regulations, technology and other controls. It has also been used to theorize about what happens when there is a loss of monopoly or oligopoly.

== History and elements of the theory ==
The theory was originally developed in the 1990s by Monroe Price, professor of law at Cardozo Law School and professor of communication studies at the Annenberg School for Communication at the University of Pennsylvania. His theory explains media regulation in terms of a market with an exchange, not of cash for goods or services, but identity for loyalty.

Economic term	Market for loyalties
Sellers	Governments and powerholders
Buyers	Citizens, community members
Price/currency	Loyalty
Goods	Identity

Price describes sellers as: "Sellers in the market are all those for whom myths and dreams and history [i.e,. identity] can somehow be converted into power and wealth—classically states, governments, interest groups, business and others." Price illustrates buyers, medium of exchange, and their relationship:

The "buyers" are citizens, subjects, nationals, consumers—recipients of packages of information, propaganda, advertisements, drama, and news propounded by the media. The consumer "pays" for one set of identities or another in several ways that, together, we call "loyalty" or "citizenship."

Payment, however, is not expressed in the ordinary coin of the realm: It includes not only compliance with tax obligations, but also obedience to laws, readiness to fight in armed services, or even continued residence within a country.

Finally, the concept of identity consists of a party platform, ideology, or national ideals and aspirations. It may be as ephemeral as the hope for a better future or as concrete as the desire for a national homeland. Identity is valuable to buyers as it contains both the legacy of their history and the promise of their dreams for the future (whether it is for wealth, a better life, or an education).

The central idea is that governments and power-holders act in such a way as to preserve their control over the market. The theory was applied with respect to markets offering identity through various media—radio and satellite broadcasting and the internet.

== Market for loyalties and monopolies ==
When a monopoly or oligopoly over the flow of information is lost, the unavoidable consequence is destabilization. Market for Loyalties Theory predicts the consequences of loss of control through the application of the concept of elasticity.

All other factors being equal, the less elasticity in the market prior to the loss of monopoly or oligopoly, the greater the destabilizing effect of the loss of such control.

Four factors affect elasticity: the number of substitute products (or identities) in the market and their closeness to the good in question; effects from marginal consumers; complications from wholesale and retail marketing; and the temporal, informational, and transaction costs necessary for consumers to learn about and take advantage of competing products.

Substitute good consist of two items where "a rise in the price of one causes an increase in demand for the other." In 1926, Marco Fanno, an Italian economist, demonstrated that elasticity (and more importantly, stability) increase with additional substitutes. In the case of the Market for Loyalties, the more substitutes for "identity", and by implication the more competition of "identity" in the instance of oligopoly, the more elastic the demand curve and the less destabilizing a loss of monopoly or oligopoly over an information environment will have. Furthermore, as the number of competing messages of identity in the Market for Loyalties approaches infinity, the presence of any new message of identity should have infinitesimal effect. Thus, when the concept of elasticity is applied to Market for Loyalties Theory, it creates an argument supporting the broadest possible freedom of speech.

A complete understanding of the economics underlying the loss of monopoly control over the market requires consideration of other factors of elasticity besides substitute goods. Additional consumers of identity, who were sidelined during prior periods of oligopoly. For instance Shi'a were marginalized in Iraq from fully participating in society during Saddam Husein's regime, and the Shi'a presence after the fall of the regime would increase demand in the Market for Loyalties.

Another important factor affecting elasticity in the Market for Loyalties and stability after loss of monopolized control is the presence of retail and wholesale markets. In Iraq the significance of tribalism, whereby loyalty could be sold "wholesale" had the effect of locking in the choices of individuals to their particular tribe. They simply were not free to choose their allegiances. The ultimate effect was to increase the inelasticity of the demand curve, thereby increasing the instability after the Market for Loyalties became more open following the removal of Saddam Husein's regime (the principal censor of information in the market).

High transaction costs (the cost of switching loyalty) also can work to create a steep demand curve and instability following monopoly control. The cost of shifting identity with and loyalty to various tribes, political organizations, and religions can be quite high—resulting in a loss of family, friends and social standing and even trigger persecution. In an intolerant society, the high transaction costs of shifting one's identity and loyalty also operate to produce an inelastic demand curve and instability upon opening of a Market for Loyalties that had been previously constricted by monopoly or oligopoly.

During the Arab Spring market for loyalties theory has been applied to explain why certain countries were more destabilized by events due to having a weaker information environment and the effect of the loss of monopoly control over that environment. This was especially true of Syria.

== See also ==
- Censorship
- Freedom of information
- Freedom of speech
- Media studies
