= WHYNOT =

Chinese-language digital magazine affiliated with Radio Free Asia (2017–2025)

- Formation: January 1, 2017; 9 years ago
- Founded at: Washington, D.C.
- Dissolved: March 21, 2025; 15 months ago
- Type: 501(c)(3) organization
- Purpose: Broadcast news magazine
- Headquarters: Washington, D.C.
- Region served: Sinosphere
- Official languages: English, Mandarin
- Owner: US Agency for Global Media
- Executive editor: Min Mitchell
- Parent organization: U.S. Agency for Global Media
- Affiliations: Radio Free Asia
- Award: Online Journalism Awards
- Website: www.wainao.me

WHYNOT, or Wainao (simplified Chinese: 歪脑; traditional Chinese: 歪腦; pinyin: Wāi Nǎo; lit. 'crooked mind'), was a Chinese-language news magazine affiliated to Radio Free Asia, headquartered in Washington, D.C.

== Overview ==
WHYNOT was funded by the United States Agency for Global Media through special public funds and mainly spread liberal values to youth groups in the Chinese-speaking world. Different from Radio Free Asia, the style and themes of WHYNOT were close to the needs and concerns of young people, including feminism, LGBT rights, vegetarianism, etc.

Global Times commented that this project was directly affected by the "Strategic Competition Act of 2021" passes by the U.S. Senate Foreign Relations Committee in April 2021, which allocated US$1.5 billion for the "Hedge China Impact Fund".

WHYNOT halted activities on 21 March 2025 after the United States Agency for Global Media terminated grants to Radio Free Asia following a directive from the Trump administration, with its employees being placed on leave.

== Awards ==
- Online Journalism Awards (OJA), 2023, Philadelphia, Online News Association
- Asia Publishing Association Awards, 2023, Hong Kong, Society of Publishers in Asia and Center for Journalism and Media Studies at The University of Hong Kong
- The 25th Human Rights Journalism Awards, 2021, Hong Kong, Hong Kong Foreign Correspondents Club, Amnesty International Hong Kong and Hong Kong Journalists Association
