= WhyNot Jazz Room =

WhyNot Jazz Room was a jazz club situated at 14 Christopher St. in West Village, New York City. It opened in December 2013 and was featuring up to 70 bands a month. Trumpeter Theo Croker was a frequent performer at the club on Thursday's with his band DVRK FUNK. Owner Emil Stefkov says of it: "It’s not a club; it’s a room. Many musicians who play here love this place simply because it’s very intimate, very small. The guests when they come here and they listen—they can feel it."
