= National Endowment for Democracy =

US quasi-autonomous non-governmental organization

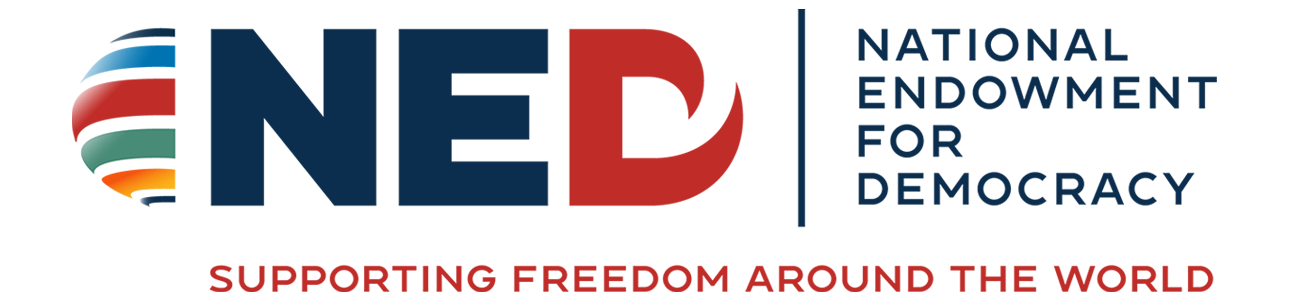
- Founded: November 18, 1983
- Founder: Carl Gershman; Allen Weinstein
- Type: 501(c)(3) non-profit NGO
- Tax ID no.: 52–1344831
- Location: Washington, D.C., U.S.
- Origins: U.S. Congress bill H.R. 2915
- Region served: Worldwide (outside United States)
- Key people: Damon Wilson (President & CEO); Peter Roskam (Chairman)
- Website: ned.org

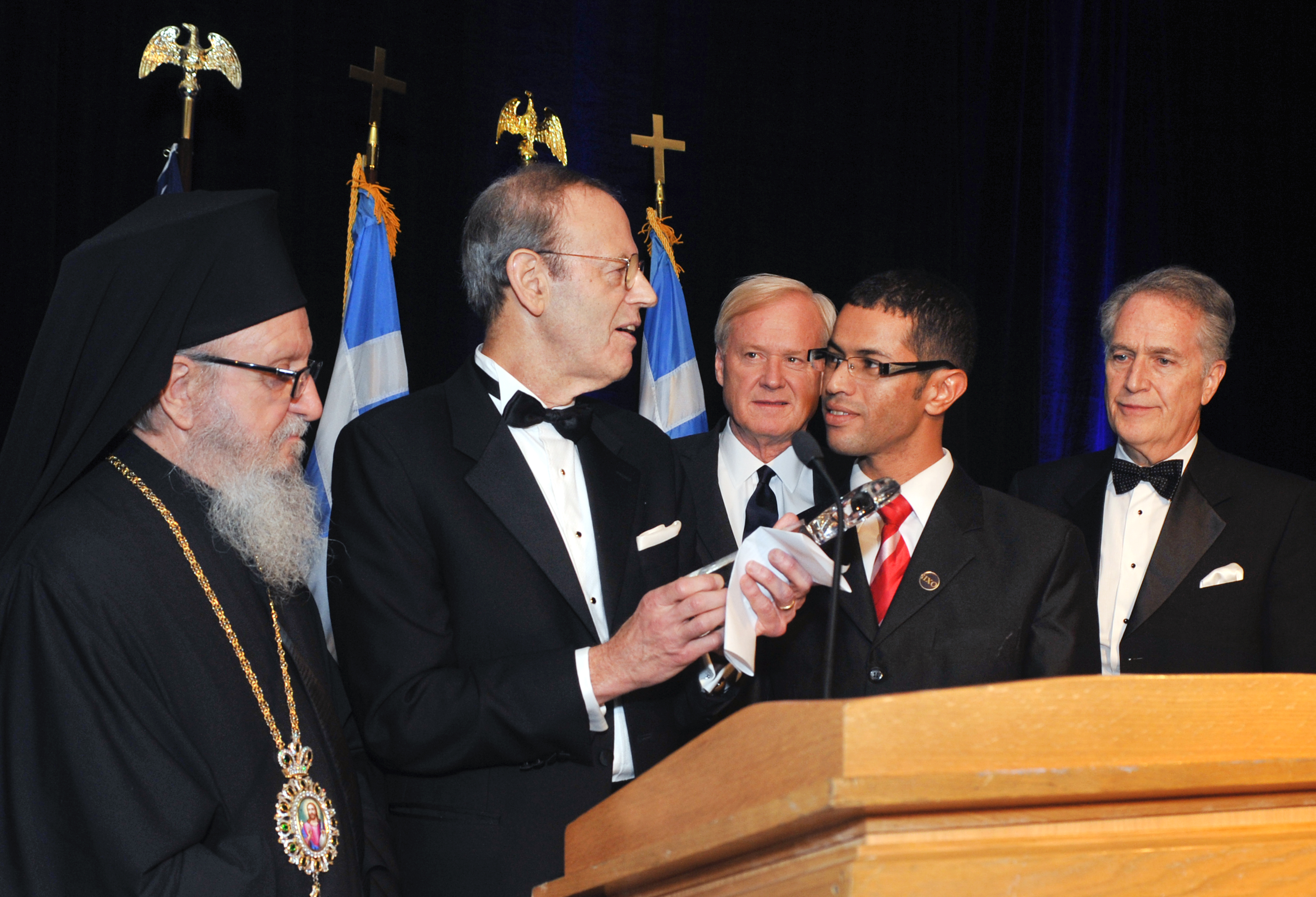
The president of the National Endowment for Democracy, Carl Gershman (second from the left), presents an award to a Tunisian leader of the Arab Spring in October 2011.

The National Endowment for Democracy (NED) is an American quasi-autonomous non-governmental organization or according to others a government-organized non-governmental organization (GONGO) founded in 1983 under a Directive of Ronald Reagan with the stated aim of advancing democracy abroad by promoting political and economic institutions, including political groups, business groups, trade unions, and free markets.

The NED was created as a bipartisan, private, non-profit corporation, but acts as a grant-making foundation. It is funded primarily by an annual allocation from the U.S. Congress. In addition to its grants program, the NED supports the World Movement for Democracy, the Reagan–Fascell Democracy Fellows Program, the Network of Democracy Research Institutes, and the Center for International Media Assistance. The NED formerly housed the Journal of Democracy, which became independent of NED and entered into an institutional partnership with Stanford University's Center on Democracy, Development and the Rule of Law in May 2026.

On its founding, the NED assumed several former activities of the Central Intelligence Agency. Political groups, activists, academics, and some governments have accused the NED of being an instrument of U.S. foreign policy helping to foster regime change. In February 2025, the Department of Government Efficiency under Elon Musk blocked disbursement from the Treasury of the NED's congressionally-mandated funding; in August 2025, the NED was granted an injunction to allow access to its funds.

== History ==
Former logo of the NED

=== Founding ===
The National Security Decision Directive 77 was instrumental for the creation of Project Democracy and its offspring NED.

In a 1982 speech at the Palace of Westminster, President Ronald Reagan proposed an initiative, before the British Parliament, "to foster the infrastructure of democracy – the system of a free press, unions, political parties, universities." This intersected with previously formulated plans by the American Political Foundation, an NGO supported by some members of the Republican and Democratic parties, together with scholars based at CSIS, to create a government-funded but privately run democracy promotion foundation to support democratic civil society groups and parties. The idea was strongly championed by the State Department, which argued that a non-governmental foundation would be able to support dissident groups and organizations in the Soviet Bloc, and also foster the emergence of democratic movements in US-allied dictatorships that were becoming unstable and in danger of experiencing leftist or radical revolutions, without provoking a diplomatic backlash against the US government. After some initial uncertainty over the idea from Reagan Administration hard-liners, the U.S. government, through USAID, contracted The American Political Foundation to study democracy promotion, which became known as "The Democracy Program".

In 1983, the House Foreign Affairs Committee proposed legislation to provide initial funding of $31.3 million for NED as part of the State Department Authorization Act (H.R. 2915), because NED was in its beginning stages of development the appropriation was set at $18 million. Included in the legislation was $13.8 million for the Free Trade Union Institute, an affiliate of the AFL–CIO, $2.5 million for an affiliate of the National Chamber Foundation, and $5 million each for two party institutes, which was later eliminated by a vote of 267–136. The conference report on H.R. 2915 was adopted by the House on November 17, 1983, and the Senate the following day. On November 18, 1983, articles of incorporation were filed in the District of Columbia to establish the National Endowment for Democracy as a nonprofit organization.

=== 1980s to present ===
An analysis by political scientist Sarah Bush found that while NED activity in the 1980s focused on direct challenges to autocrats by funding dissidents, opposition parties, and unions, the majority of 21st-century NED funding goes to technical programs that are less likely to challenge the status quo, with the proportion of NED funding for "relatively tame programs" increasing from roughly 20% of NED grants in 1986 to roughly 60% in 2009. Political scientist Lindsey A. O'Rourke writes that, "Today, NED programs run in more than ninety countries. Although the number of US-backed democracy promotion programs have grown, most of today's programs pursue less aggressive objectives than their Cold War counterparts." In a 1991 interview with the Washington Post, NED founder Allen Weinstein said: "A lot of what we do today was done covertly 25 years ago by the CIA."

During the 1984 Panamanian general election the American Institute for Free Labor Development and the NED provided around $20,000 in support of activists involved with Ardito Barletta's campaign.

In 1984, NED began its activities in China, helping to launch the Chinese-language quarterly journal The Chinese Intellectual (TCI) and funding its publications. The journal, which was originally targeted at Chinese students and scholars in the West, opened offices in Beijing in 1988. The TCI was forced to move back to New York following the 1989 Tiananmen Square protests and massacre.

The NED was active in Yugoslavia before its dissolution. It arranged meetings between Yugoslav dissidents and members of the U.S. Congress, U.S. government officials, and members of the media. It also gave funds to Freedom House which were used to fund the Yugoslav opposition.

Since 2004, NED has granted $8,758,300 to overseas Uyghur groups and initiatives including the World Uyghur Congress, the Uyghur Human Rights Project, the Campaign for Uyghurs and The Uyghur Transitional Justice Database Project. It has also provided extensive grants for programs pertaining to Tibet. Between 2005 and 2012, it gave grants to the China Free Press NGO and in 2019 it gave about $643,000 to civil society programs in Hong Kong. In response, in 2020 China imposed sanctions on NED president Carl Gershman and Michael Abramowitz, the president of Freedom House.

The NED played a role in supporting the Arab Spring of 2011. For example, the April 6 Youth Movement in Egypt, the Bahrain Center for Human Rights and individual Yemeni activist Entsar Qadhi received training and finances from the NED. In Egypt, between 2008 and 2012, it also supported Colonel Omar Afifi Soliman, an exiled police officer who opposed both Hosni Mubarak's and Mohamed Morsi's presidencies, as well as secularist activist Esraa Abdel-Fatah's Egyptian Democratic Academy in 2011.

==== Second Trump administration ====
In 2025, Elon Musk criticized the NED as "rife with corruption" and guilty of "crimes", later calling it an "evil organization" that "needs to be dissolved". He also wrote "NED is a SCAM." In February 2025, Musk's Department of Government Efficiency cut funding to the NED by blocking disbursement from the U.S. Department of Treasury, causing significant disruptions to the organization. The Free Press believes that dismantling the NED would symbolise a momentous change in U.S. foreign policy, undermining the idea that democratic ideals foster U.S. global strength and influence, and that the Trump administration therefore no longer believes that promoting democracy in the world is in the national interest. On February 12, the NED informed the organizations it funds that it would suspend payments immediately. Additionally, organizations supported by NED started laying off staff and cutting expenditures. On March 1, NED's International Forum for Democratic Studies suspended operations due to inability to access funding. They also had to furlough most of the staff. On March 5, the NED filed a lawsuit against the U.S. government in the United States District Court for the District of Columbia. On August 12, the NED was granted an injunction to allow it to access the remaining $95 million of its previously appropriated funds for 2025.

== Funding and structure ==
NED is a grant-making foundation, distributing funds to private non-governmental organizations for promoting democracy abroad in around 90 countries. Half of NED's funding is allocated annually to four main U.S. organizations: the American Center for International Labor Solidarity (associated with the AFL–CIO), the Center for International Private Enterprise (affiliated with the United States Chamber of Commerce), the National Democratic Institute for International Affairs (associated with the Democratic Party), and the International Republican Institute (formerly known as the National Republican Institute for International Affairs and affiliated with the Republican Party). The other half of NED's funding is awarded annually to hundreds of non-governmental organizations based abroad which apply for support. In 2011, the Democratic and Republican Institutes channeled around $100 million through the NED.

=== Source of funding ===
The NED receives an annual appropriation from the U.S. budget (it is included in the chapter of the State Department budget allocated for USAID) and is subject to congressional oversight even as a non-governmental organization.

From 1984 to 1990 the NED received $15–18 million of congressional funding annually, and $25–30 million from 1991 to 1993. At the time the funding came via the United States Information Agency. In 1993 the NED nearly lost its congressional funding, after the House of Representatives initially voted to abolish its funding. The funding (of $35 million, a rise from $30 million the year before) was only retained after a vigorous campaign by NED supporters.

In the financial year to the end of September 2009 NED had an income of $135.5 million, nearly all of which came from U.S. government agencies. In addition to government funding, the NED has received funding from foundations, such as the Smith Richardson Foundation, the John M. Olin Foundation, and others. The Bradley Foundation supported the Journal of Democracy with $1.5 million during 1990–2008.

In 2018, President Donald Trump proposed to slash the NED's funding and cut its links to the Democratic and Republican Institutes.

== Center for International Media Assistance (CIMA) ==
In 2006, CIMA was founded as an initiative of the National Endowment for Democracy with encouragement from Congress and a grant from the State Department's Bureau of Democracy, Human Rights and Labor. CIMA promotes the work of independent media and journalists abroad, with a focus on the developing world, social media, digital media, and citizen journalism. It issued its first report, Empowering Independent Media: U.S. Efforts to Foster Free and Independent Media Around the World, in 2008, and subsequently issued other reports, including a report on digital media in conflict-prone societies and a report on mobile phone use in Africa.

== Reception ==
Writing in Slate in 2004, Brendan I. Koerner wrote that, "Depending on whom you ask, the NED is either a nonprofit champion of liberty or an ideologically driven meddler in world affairs."

NED has been criticized by both the right and the left. Some on the right accuse the NED of having a pro-social democracy agenda, promoted through its labor affiliate; conversely, some on the left accuse the NED of being "a rightwing initiative" oriented toward Reagan's Cold War politics. Within Latin America, critics accuse the NED of manifesting U.S. paternalism or imperialism, conversely, "supporters say that it helps many groups with a social-democratic and liberal orientation across the world," providing training and support for pro-democracy groups that criticize the U.S. In a 2004 article for the Washington Post, Michael McFaul argues that the NED is not an instrument of U.S. foreign policy. He said he experienced the difference between the actions of US policymakers and the actions of the National Democratic Institute (NDI) while representing the NDI in Moscow during the last days of the Soviet Union: U.S. policymakers supported Mikhail Gorbachev while the NDI worked with Democratic Russia, Gorbachev's opponents. NED has said in public statements that democracy evolves "according to the needs and traditions of diverse political cultures" and does not necessitate an American-style model.

In 1986, NED's President Carl Gershman said that the NED was created because "It would be terrible for democratic groups around the world to be seen as subsidized by the CIA. We saw that in the 1960s and that's why it has been discontinued". Throughout the course of a 2010 investigation by ProPublica, Paul Steiger, the then editor in chief of the publication said that "those who spearheaded creation of NED have long acknowledged it was part of an effort to move from covert to overt efforts to foster democracy" and cited as evidence a 1991 interview in which then-NED president Allen Weinstein said, "A lot of what we do today was done covertly 25 years ago by the CIA."

Critics have compared the NED's funding of Nicaraguan groups (pro-U.S. and conservative unions, political parties, student groups, business groups, and women's associations) in the 1980s and 1990s in Nicaragua to the previous CIA effort "to challenge and undermine" a left-wing government in Chile. (Latin Americanist scholar William M. LeoGrande writes that the NED's roughly $2 million funding into Nicaragua between 1984 and 1988 was the "main source of overt assistance to the civic opposition," of which about half went to the anti-Sandinista newspaper La Prensa.) According to sociologist William Robinson, NED funds during the Reagan years were "ultimately used for five overlapping pseudo-covert activities: leadership training for pro-American elites, promotion of pro-American educational systems and mass media, strengthening the 'institutions of democracy' by funding pro-American organizations in the target state, propaganda, and the development of transnational elite networks." Criticizing these activities, Robinson wrote that "U.S. policymakers claim that they are interested in process (free and fair elections) and not outcome (the results of these elections); in reality, the principal concern is outcome."

Political scientist Lindsey A. O'Rourke writes that the Reagan-era NED played a key role in U.S. efforts "to promote democratic transitions in Chile, Haiti, Liberia, Nicaragua, Panama, the Philippines, Poland, and Suriname," but did so to promote the success of pro-U.S. parties, not just to promote democracy, and did not support communist or socialist opposition parties. The North American Congress on Latin America says that the NED engages in a "a very particular form of low-intensity democracy chained to pro-market economics--in countries from Nicaragua to the Philippines, Ukraine to Haiti, overturning unfriendly 'authoritarian' governments (many of which the United States had previously supported) and replacing them with handpicked pro-market allies."

=== Thailand and Malaysia ===
In the 2020 Thai protests, pro-government groups cited NED support for protester-sympathizing groups to assert that the US government was masterminding the protests. The United States Embassy in Bangkok formally denied allegations of funding or supporting protesters.

In August 2021, Malaysian human rights activist and Suaram adviser Kua Kia Soong criticized the opposition coalition Pakatan Harapan for accepting funding from the National Endowment of Democracy, which he described as a "CIA soft power front". Citing the US track record of supporting regime change abroad and racial discrimination against Black and Asian Americans, Kua urged Malaysian civil society organizations to stop accepting funding from the NED since it undermined their legitimacy, independence, and effectiveness. Kua's statement came after Daniel Twining, the president of the NED affiliate International Republican Institute, had made remarks in 2018 acknowledging that the NED had financially supported Malaysian opposition parties and NGOs, including Suaram since 2002 (Kua said that Suaram no longer accepts funds from NED upon realizing about the nature of NED). Following the 2018 Malaysian general election Twining had also praised the newly elected Pakatan Harapan government for freezing Chinese infrastructural investments.

=== Reaction from foreign governments ===
==== Russia ====
Russian government officials and state media have frequently regarded the NED as hostile to their country. In 2015, the Russian state news agency RIA Novosti blamed NED grants for the Euromaidan mass protests that forced Ukrainian president Viktor Yanukovych from power. In July 2015, the Russian government declared NED to be an "undesirable" NGO, making the NED the first organization banned under the Russian undesirable organizations law signed two months earlier by Russian president Vladimir Putin.

==== China ====
During the 2014 Hong Kong protests, a Chinese state-run newspaper accused the US of using the NED to fund pro-democracy protesters. Michael Pillsbury, a Hudson Institute foreign policy analyst and former Reagan administration official, stated that the accusation was "not totally false". In 2019, the Chinese government sanctioned the NED in response to the passage by the U.S. Congress of the Hong Kong Human Rights and Democracy Act. The Chinese government stated that the NED and CIA worked in tandem to covertly foment the 2019–20 Hong Kong protests, and that NED acted as a U.S. intelligence front.

NED was one of several U.S.-based NGOs sanctioned by the Chinese government; others included the Human Rights Watch, Freedom House, the National Democratic Institute, and the International Republican Institute. China also already tightly restricted the activities of foreign NGOs in China, particularly since 2016, and the NGOs sanctioned by China typically do not have offices on the mainland; as a result, the sanctions were regarded as mostly symbolic. NED grant recipients in Hong Kong included labor advocacy and human rights groups such as the Solidarity Center and Justice Centre Hong Kong. The Chinese government said that the sanctioned organizations were "anti-China" forces that "incite separatist activities for Hong Kong independence"; a U.S. State Department official said that "false accusations of foreign interference" against U.S.-based NGOs were "intended to distract from the legitimate concerns of Hongkongers." NED has denied it provided aid to protestors in 2019.

In August 2020, the Chinese government sanctioned NED chairman Carl Gershman, together with the heads of four other U.S.-based democracy and human rights organizations and six U.S. Republican lawmakers for supporting the Hong Kong pro-democracy movement in the 2019–20 Hong Kong protests. The unspecified sanctions were a tit-for-tat measure responding to the earlier sanctioning by the U.S. of 11 Hong Kong officials in response to the enactment of the Hong Kong National Security Law in June 2020.

In December 2020 China sanctioned the senior director of the NED, John Knaus, saying he "blatantly interferes in Hong Kong affairs and grossly interferes in China's domestic affairs".

In May 2022, the Chinese Ministry of Foreign Affairs accused NED of funding separatists to undermine the stability of target countries, instigating color revolutions to subvert state power, and meddling in other countries' politics.

==== India ====
In 2016, India's Ministry of Home Affairs put NED on a watchlist, along with the Open Society Foundation (OSF) and World Movement for Democracy. They were placed under the "prior permission" category and are not allowed to extend any financial assistance to other NGOs or individuals without explicit clearance from the ministry.

==== Other reactions ====
Other governments that have objected to NED activity include Iran, Egypt, India, and Venezuela.

== See also ==
- List of recipients of the Democracy Service Medal
- National Democratic Institute for International Affairs
- Transnational repression
- United Nations Democracy Fund
- Westminster Foundation for Democracy
