= Monroe Price =

American academic (1938–2026)

Monroe Edwin Price (August 18, 1938 – March 16, 2026) was an American academic who was director of the University of Pennsylvania's Center for Global Communication Studies (CGCS) at the Annenberg School for Communication at the University of Pennsylvania and director of the Stanhope Centre for Communications Policy Research in London.

== Life and career ==
In the early 1970s, Price was deputy director of the Sloan Commission on Cable Communications, an entity which produced the report "On the Cable, The Television of Abundance" (1971).

Price's first scholarly and public interest achievements were in the area of American Indian Law. In the 1970s, he published Law and the American Indian. He also helped found California Indian Legal Services and the Native American Rights Fund. His work coincided with his tenure at the UCLA School of Law, where he was a professor. For much of the decade, he represented Cook Inlet Region, Inc., a Native Corporation established under the Alaska Native Claims Act and served as counsel for Munger, Tolles & Olson in Los Angeles. In the early 1980s, he was the court-appointed referee in Crawford v. Los Angeles Board of Education, the Los Angeles school desegregation case.

He was also the Joseph and Sadie Danciger Professor of Law and director of the Howard M. Squadron Program in Law, Media and Society at the Cardozo School of Law, where he served as dean from 1982 to 1991.

Price was founding director of the Program in Comparative Media Law and Policy (PCMLP) at the University of Oxford. In honor of his role, PCMLP created an International Media Media Law Moot Court competition after him, the annual Price Media Law Moot Court. He also established the Center for Media, Data and Society at Central European University. His work on media and the post-1989 transitions included service on the Commission on Radio and Television Policy, established late in the Gorbachev era to bring together Soviet and US professionals and academics working on broadcasting and society.

During this period, Price established and edited the Post-Soviet Media Law and Policy Newsletter. This eventuated in a book, Russian Media Law and Policy in the Yeltsin Decade, edited by him, Andrei Richter and Peter Yu.

After graduating from the Yale Law School, Price was a law clerk to associate justice of the United States Supreme Court, Potter Stewart. He was assistant to the Secretary of Labor, W. Willard Wirtz, 1965–1966. He was a researcher for the Warren Commission (The President's Commission on the Assassination of President Kennedy).

He was a Member of the School of Social Sciences at the Institute for Advanced Study at Princeton, a fellow of the Media Studies Center, and a resident scholar at the Rockefeller Foundation Bellagio Center. He has given many lectures, including the 2001 Graham Spry Lecture, and has organized conferences with the American-Austrian Foundation, the Oxford Internet Institute, Communications University of China, Renmin University, Reuters Institute for the Study of Journalism, and others.

Price was best known as a communications scholar for theories developed in a 1994 article in the Yale Law Journal, the 'Market for Loyalties. This theory examines media regulation in terms of a market with an exchange, not of cash for goods or services, but identity for loyalty.

Among his many books are Media and Sovereignty (MIT Press, 2002), Television, The Public Sphere and National Identity (Oxford University Press, 1996), and Owning the Olympics: Narratives of the New China (University of Michigan Press, 2008, edited with Daniel Dayan). In 2007, Price published a memoir, Objects of Remembrance: A Memoir of American Opportunities and Viennese Dreams. The book, chronicles the experiences of becoming an American in the 1950s, as a Midwest child of refugees.

He held a B.A. and a LL.B (now a Juris Doctor) from Yale University. Price died on March 16, 2026, at the age of 87.

== See also ==
- List of law clerks for the eighth seat of the Supreme Court of the United States
