= Price Media Law Moot Court Competition =

Moot court competition at Oxford University

- Established: 2007
- Venue: Oxford University
- Subject matter: International human rights
- Class: Grand Slam
- Record participation: 121 teams (2014)
- Qualification: National/regional rounds
- Most championships: Singapore Management University School of Law (4; 1 online)
- Website: www.law.ox.ac.uk/centres-institutes/bonavero-institute-human-rights/monroe-e-price-media-law-moot-court-competition

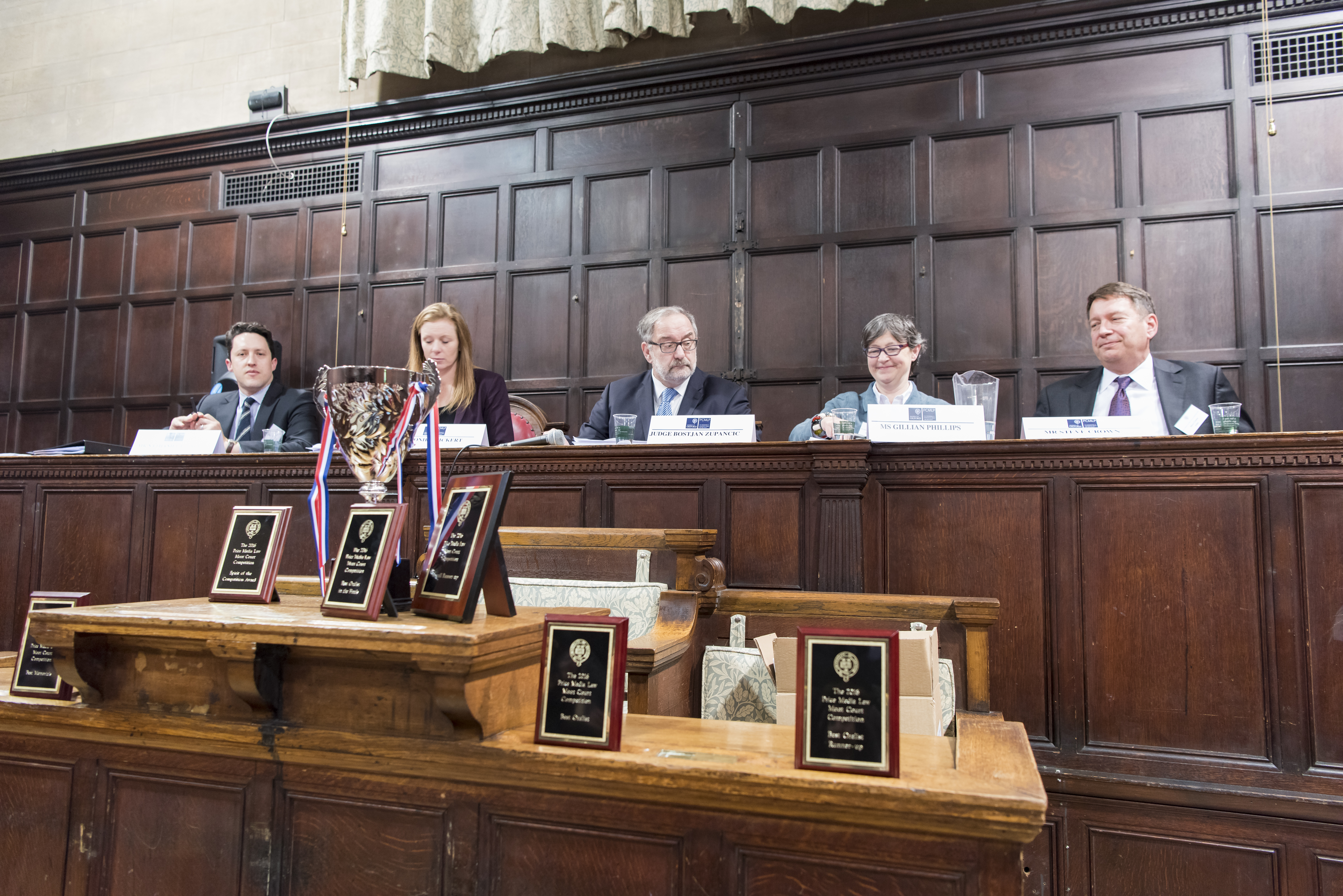
The judges for the 2016 international championship final with European Court of Human Rights judge Boštjan Zupančič presiding; judges in the final typically include lawyers working with the likes of Google, Facebook, and Microsoft.

The Price Media Law Moot Court Competition or Price Moot in short, is an annual international moot court competition. Described as a competition "for raising the profile of freedom of expression by bringing informed and effective debate and discussion on significant issues of information flows and technology to many parts of the world", the Price Moot focuses on international media law and related human rights such as freedom of expression, freedom of religion, freedom of association, and various facets of privacy. The main sources of law engaged include the Universal Declaration of Human Rights, European Convention on Human Rights, and the International Covenant of Civil and Political Rights. Recurring topics include online hate speech and the responsibility of internet intermediaries. With more than a hundred teams taking part annually, the Price Moot is the world's largest competition in its field and is considered one of the grand slam or major moots.

The moot was created and organised by the Programme in Comparative Media Law and Policy at the University of Oxford, and is named after the programme's founding director, Monroe E. Price, a professor specialising in communications law. In 2017, the Bonavero Institute of Human Rights took over as the organiser. The international rounds of the competition are held at the University of Oxford; a series of events is typically organised leading up to these rounds, such as seminars on human rights and masterclasses on advocacy. National and regional rounds were introduced in 2010 and have since taken place in Afghanistan, the Americas, Latin America, Asia-Pacific, China, Africa, East Africa, West Africa, Middle East, South Asia, Northern Europe, Northeast Europe, and Southeast Europe. As of the tenth edition of the moot (2017), 130 universities from 52 countries have taken part in the competition. Singapore Management University, which made its debut in 2010, has the best track record in the moot, having reached the finals on eight occasions (winning the 2010, 2016, 2017, and 2020 editions), won Best Memorials four times (2010, 2016, 2018, and 2023), won Best Finals Oralist four times (2017, 2018, 2020, and 2025), and won Best Oralist twice (2017 and 2022). In addition, Singapore Management University was the first champion school to have won both Best Finals Oralist and Best Oralist in the same year (2017).

Each university may send a team comprising up to six members. Regional round procedures may vary, but in Oxford, each team will compete in between three and four preliminary rounds. The top 16 teams advance to the knockout rounds, and the final two teams compete in the international championship round following the octo-finals, quarter-finals, and semi-finals. In every round, each team has 45 minutes (rebuttals and surebuttals inclusive) to plead a case. Each team also has to prepare a set of written submissions for applicant and respondent before the oral phase of the competition begins; the scores for the written submissions count toward qualification up till a certain point. In 2020, travel restrictions brought about by the COVID-19 pandemic meant that a modified version of the moot was conducted online for the 2020 edition's international rounds; the regional rounds were completed per usual. For the 2021 and 2022 editions, with most travel restrictions still in place, all rounds remained online (with modifications to the format as well), but for the 2023 edition, various rounds reverted to the in-person format. The international rounds reverted to the in-person format in 2024, but not all regional rounds did.

== Competition records ==
| Year | Total number of teams | Number of teams at international rounds | Champion (win number) | Runner-up (win number) | Semi-finalists | Quarter-finalists | Best Oralist | Best Finals Oralist (win number) | Best Memorials (win number) | Regional champions |
|---|---|---|---|---|---|---|---|---|---|---|
| 2008 | 8 | 8 | International Islamic University Malaysia (1) | Tbilisi State University (1) | | NA | * 1st: International Islamic University Malaysia * 2nd: International Islamic University Malaysia * 3rd: University of Zimbabwe | NA | International Islamic University Malaysia (1) | NA |
| 2009 | 13 | 13 | Cardozo School of Law (1) | BPP Law School (1) | * International Islamic University Malaysia * Tbilisi State University | | * 1st: Cardozo School of Law * 2nd: BPP School of Law * 3rd: Tbilisi State University | NA | * 1st: BPP Law School (1) * 2nd: Communication University of China | NA |
| 2010 | 25 | 25 | Singapore Management University (1) | Cardozo School of Law (1) | * University of Bucharest * Hidayatullah National Law University | * International Islamic University Malaysia * Leiden University * National University of Kyiv-Mohyla Academy * The School of Excellence in Law, Chennai | * 1st: International Islamic University Malaysia * 2nd: University College London | NA | * 1st: Singapore Management University (1) * 2nd: University of Bucharest | NA |
| 2011 | 28 | 28 | Belgrade Law School (1) | Cardozo School of Law (2) | * University of Pennsylvania * National Law School of India University | * National University of Kyiv-Mohyla Academy * National University of Singapore * Kaplan Law School * National University of Juridical Sciences | * 1st: National Law School of India University * 2nd: National Law School of India University * 3rd: University of Pennsylvania | NA | * 1st: Belgrade Law School (1) * 2nd: Korea University | NA |
| 2012 | 70 | 33 | NALSAR University of Law (1) | University of Technology Sydney (1) | * Valparaiso University * National Law University, Delhi | * Singapore Management University * National Law School of India University * Moi University * National University of Juridical Sciences | * 1st: Kaplan Law School * 2nd: Singapore Management University | University of Technology Sydney (1) | * 1st: National Law School of India University (1) * 2nd: Valparaiso University | NA |
| 2013 | 115 | 40 | National Law University, Delhi (1) | Regent University (1) | * Singapore Management University * Southwestern Law School | * Brooklyn Law School * Hugh Wooding Law School * Universidade de São Paulo * National Law School of India University | * 1st: University of Oxford * 2nd: National Law University, Delhi * 3rd: National Law University, Delhi * Singapore Management University * Brooklyn Law School | National Law University, Delhi (1) | * 1st: University of Nis (1) * 2nd: Southwestern Law School * 3rd: University of Technology Sydney | NA |
| 2014 | 121 | 35 | Jindal Global Law School (1) | University of Oxford (1) | * Brooklyn Law School * Queen Mary University | * China University of Political Science and Law * Hugh Wooding Law School * Singapore Management University * University of Technology Sydney | * 1st: University of Technology Sydney * 2nd: Hugh Wooding Law School * 3rd: National University of Juridical Sciences | University of Oxford (1) | * 1st: University of Zagreb (1) * 2nd: University of Nairobi | NA |
| 2015 | 92 | 39 | University of the Philippines (1) | Singapore Management University (1) | * Florida International University * National Law University, Jodhpur | * Ghent University * New York University * Regent University * University of São Paulo | * 1st: Brooklyn Law School * 2nd: Regent University * Brooklyn Law School * University of the Philippines * Singapore Management University | University of the Philippines (1) | * 1st: Regent University (1) * 2nd: Brooklyn Law School * 3rd: National Law University, Jodhpur | NA |
| 2016 | 93 | 40 | Singapore Management University (2) | Jindal Global Law School (1) | * National Law Institute University * University of Technology Sydney | * National University of Singapore * Osgoode Hall Law School * University of Melbourne * University of Oxford | * 1st: University of Zagreb * 2nd: Jindal Global Law School | Jindal Global Law School (1) | * 1st: Singapore Management University (2) * 2nd: Regent University | NA |
| 2017 | 92 | 44 | Singapore Management University (3) | University of Oxford (2) | * University of the Philippines * University of San Carlos | * Lyceum of the Philippines University * National Law School of India University * National University of Kyiv-Mohyla Academy * University of Technology Sydney | * Singapore Management University * University of San Carlos * Singapore Management University | Singapore Management University (1) | * 1st: Brooklyn Law School (1) * 2nd: Vilnius University | NA |
| 2018 | 92 | 43 | University of San Carlos (1) | Singapore Management University (2) | * National Law University, Delhi * Rajiv Gandhi National University of Law | * Brooklyn Law School * Osgoode Hall Law School * University of Malaya * University of Oxford | * National University of Kyiv-Mohyla Academy * University of San Carlos * Rajiv Gandhi National University of Law * Singapore Management University * Singapore Management University | Singapore Management University (2) | * 1st: Singapore Management University (3) and National Law University, Delhi (1) * 2nd: National University of Kyiv-Mohyla Academy | NA |
| 2019 | 96 | 35 | University of the Philippines (2) | National University of Kyiv-Mohyla Academy (1) | * Osgoode Hall Law School * Singapore Management University | * Gujarat National Law University * Lyceum of the Philippines University * University of Malaya * University of Oxford | * 1st: University of the Philippines * 2nd: Gujarat National Law University * 3rd: University of the Philippines | University of the Philippines (2) | * 1st: University of Malaya (1) * 2nd: National University of Singapore | NA |
| 2020 (online for international rounds) | 112 | 43 | Singapore Management University (4) | University of Oxford (3) | * China University of Political Science and Law * University of Malaya | * National University of Singapore * Eötvös Loránd University * National Law School of India University * University of Luxembourg | * 1st University of the Philippines * 2nd: University of Malaya | Singapore Management University (3) | * 1st: University of Oxford (1) * 2nd: University of Malaya | * Asia-Pacific: Singapore Management University * South Asia: National Law School of India University * Americas: Universidade de São Paulo * Northeast Europe: Belarusian State University * Southeast Europe: Eötvös Loránd University * Northern Europe: University of Oxford * Africa: NA * Middle East: NA |
| 2021 (online for all rounds) | 100 | 30 | National Law School of India University (1) | City, University of London (1) | * Symbiosis Law School, Pune * University of Malaya | NA | * 1st: University of Bucharest * 2nd: Law Society of Ireland | City, University of London (1) | * 1st: University of Malaya (2) * 2nd: Symbiosis Law School, Pune | * Asia-Pacific: Singapore Management University * South Asia: Symbiosis Law School, Pune * Americas: University of Pennsylvania * Northeast Europe: National University of Kyiv-Mohyla Academy * Southeast Europe: National and Kapodistrian University of Athens * Northern Europe: Law Society of Ireland * Africa: University of Pretoria * Middle East: Birzeit University |
| 2022 (online for all rounds) | 80 | 27 | Rajiv Gandhi National University of Law (1) | NALSAR University of Law (1) | * Singapore Management University * University of Pretoria | | * 1st: Singapore Management University | Rajiv Gandhi National University of Law (1) | * 1st: University of the Philippines (1) * 2nd: University of Malaya | * Asia-Pacific: University of Malaya * South Asia: Rajiv Gandhi National University of Law * Americas: Northwestern University * Northeast Europe: National University of Kyiv-Mohyla Academy * Southeast Europe: University of Sarajevo * Northern Europe: Law Society of Ireland * Africa: University of Pretoria * Middle East: The British University in Egypt |
| 2023 (online for international rounds) | 85 | 35 | University of the Philippines (3) | City, University of London (2) | * Peking University School of Transnational Law * University of International Business and Economics | NA | * 1st: Osgoode Hall Law School | * City, University of London (2) * University of the Philippines (3) | * 1st: Singapore Management University (4) * 2nd: Peking University School of Transnational Law | * Asia Pacific: Singapore Management University * Central Eastern Europe: University of Ljubljana * Northern Europe: University of Oxford * South Asia: NALSAR University * Americas: Osgoode Hall Law School * Middle East: German University in Cairo |
| 2024 | 98 | 33 | University of Chicago (1) | Singapore Management University (3) | * National Law University, Jodhpur * Jindal Global Law School | * University of the Philippines * Osgoode Hall Law School | * 1st: University of the Philippines * 2nd: University of San Carlos | University of Chicago (1) | * 1st: Eötvös Loránd University (1) * 2nd: National Law School of India University | * Africa: Moi University * Asia Pacific: Singapore Management University * South Asia: National Law University, Jodhpur * Americas: University of Chicago * Europe: University of Cambridge * Middle East: The British University in Egypt |
| 2025 | 89 | 37 | National Law University, Delhi (2) | Singapore Management University (4) | * Cardozo School of Law * University of Chicago | * Jindal Global Law School * Osgoode Hall Law School * University of the Philippines * Universidade de São Paulo | * 1st: University of the Philippines * 2nd: Singapore Management University * 3rd: Singapore Management University | Singapore Management University (4) | * 1st: Jindal Global Law School (1) * 2nd: Peking University School of Transnational Law | * Africa: University of Nairobi * Americas: University of Chicago University of Chicago * Asia Pacific: University of International Business and Economics * South Asia: National Law University, Delhi * Europe: Eötvös Loránd University * Middle East: |
| 2026 | 86 | 35 | University of San Agustin (1) | Osgoode Hall Law School (1) | * University of Oxford * NALSAR University of Law | * Singapore Management University * Cardozo School of Law * National Law Institute University * University of the Philippines | * 1st: Osgoode Hall Law School * 2nd: University of Belgrade | Osgoode Hall Law School (1) | * 1st: University of Vienna (1) * 2nd: Peking University School of Transnational Law | * Africa: Africa University * Americas: University of Chicago * Asia Pacific: Singapore Management University * South Asia: NALSAR University of Law * Europe: National University of Kyiv-Mohyla Academy * Middle East: The British University in Egypt |
