= Oriana Skylar Mastro =

American political scientist and author

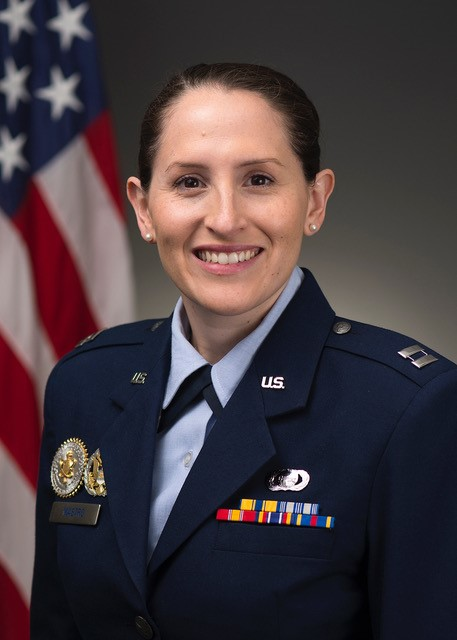
- Other name: 梅惠琳
- Education: Stanford University (BA); Princeton University (MA, PhD)
- Occupations: Political scientist, China specialist
- Employer(s): Stanford University, Carnegie Endowment for International Peace
- Spouse: Arzan Tarapore
- Awards: U.S. Air Force Individual Reservist Company Grade Officer of the Year (2016 and 2022)
- Website: www.orianaskylarmastro.com
- Military career
- Allegiance: United States
- Branch: United States Air Force Reserve
- Rank: Lieutenant colonel
- Awards: Meritorious Service Medal

Oriana Skylar Mastro is an American political scientist, author and lieutenant colonel in the United States Air Force Reserve. She is a Center Fellow at the Freeman Spogli Institute for International Studies and assistant professor of Political Science at Stanford University. She is also a non-resident scholar at the Carnegie Endowment for International Peace and Deputy Chief of Reserve China Global Strategy at The Pentagon. Her research focuses on Asia–Pacific security, Chinese military and security policy, war termination and coercive diplomacy.

== Career ==
Mastro holds a Bachelor of Arts (2006) in East Asian studies from Stanford University (where she studied Mandarin) and a Master of Arts (2009) and PhD (2013) in politics from Princeton University. From 2006 to 2007, Mastro was a junior fellow for the Carnegie Endowment for International Peace's China program. In 2008, while a doctoral student at Princeton, Mastro met with then deputy commander of the United States Indo-Pacific Command (USINDOPACOM), Lieutenant General Dan P. Leaf, at a conference. Leaf suggested that she enlist in the U.S. military after learning about her plan to pursue a summer internship with USINDOPACOM to better research how the military dealt with issues in the Asia–Pacific region. Despite initially deciding to continue with an internship instead, Mastro enlisted in the U.S. Air Force in late 2008 and later started officer training to commission as a second lieutenant.

In 2009, Mastro joined the Department of Defense as an analyst for USINDOPACOM. Subsequently, in 2010, she worked for the Project 2049 Institute as a summer associate. From 2012 to 2013, she was a fellow at the Center for a New American Security. In 2013, Mastro was appointed assistant professor of security studies at Georgetown's Edmund A. Walsh School of Foreign Service, and in 2020, she was appointed a center fellow at Stanford's Freeman Spogli Institute for International Studies.

In the meantime, Mastro has also continued her military service in the U.S. Air Force Reserve. She was named the Air Force's Individual Reservist Company Grade Officer of the Year in both 2016 and 2022.

== Publications ==
- Upstart: How China Became A Great Power, Oxford University Press, May 23, 2024
- “Sino-Russian Military Alignment and Its Implications for Global Security,” Security Studies (April 2024): 1-37.
- “Talking to the Enemy: Explaining the Emergence of Peace Talks in Interstate War,” with David Siegel, Journal of Theoretical Politics 35, no. 3 (July 2023).
- “The Next Flashpoint? China, the Republic of Korea, and the Yellow Sea,” Asia Policy 18, no. 1 (January 2023): 67–93.
- “Deterrence in the Indo-Pacific,” in “Roundtable: Minilateral Deterrence in the Indo-Pacific,” Asia Policy 17, no. 4 (October 2022): 8–18.
- “Reassurance and Deterrence in Asia,” Security Studies 31, no. 4 (Fall 2022): 743–750.
- The Military Challenge of the People's Republic of China, in Defense Budgeting for a Safer World: The Experts Speak, Hoover Institution, November 1, 2023
- Project Atom 2023: A Competitive Strategies Approach for U.S. Nuclear Posture through 2035, Center for Strategic and International Studies, September 30, 2023 (co-authored with Heather Williams, Kelsey Hartigan, Lachlan MacKenzie, Robert Soofer, Tom Karako, Franklin Miller, Leonor Tomero, and Jon Wolfsthal)
- Deepening US–Taiwan Cooperation Through Semiconductors, in Silicon Triangle: The United States, Taiwan, China, and Global Semiconductor Security, Hoover Institution, July 18, 2023 (co-authored with Kharis Templeman)
- The Costs of Conversation: Obstacles to Peace Talks in Wartime, Cornell University Press, Security Affairs Series, 2019

== Personal life ==
Mastro is married to Arzan Tarapore, a research scholar at Stanford's Freeman Spogli Institute for International Studies.
