= Yang Yao (academic) =

Chinese professor

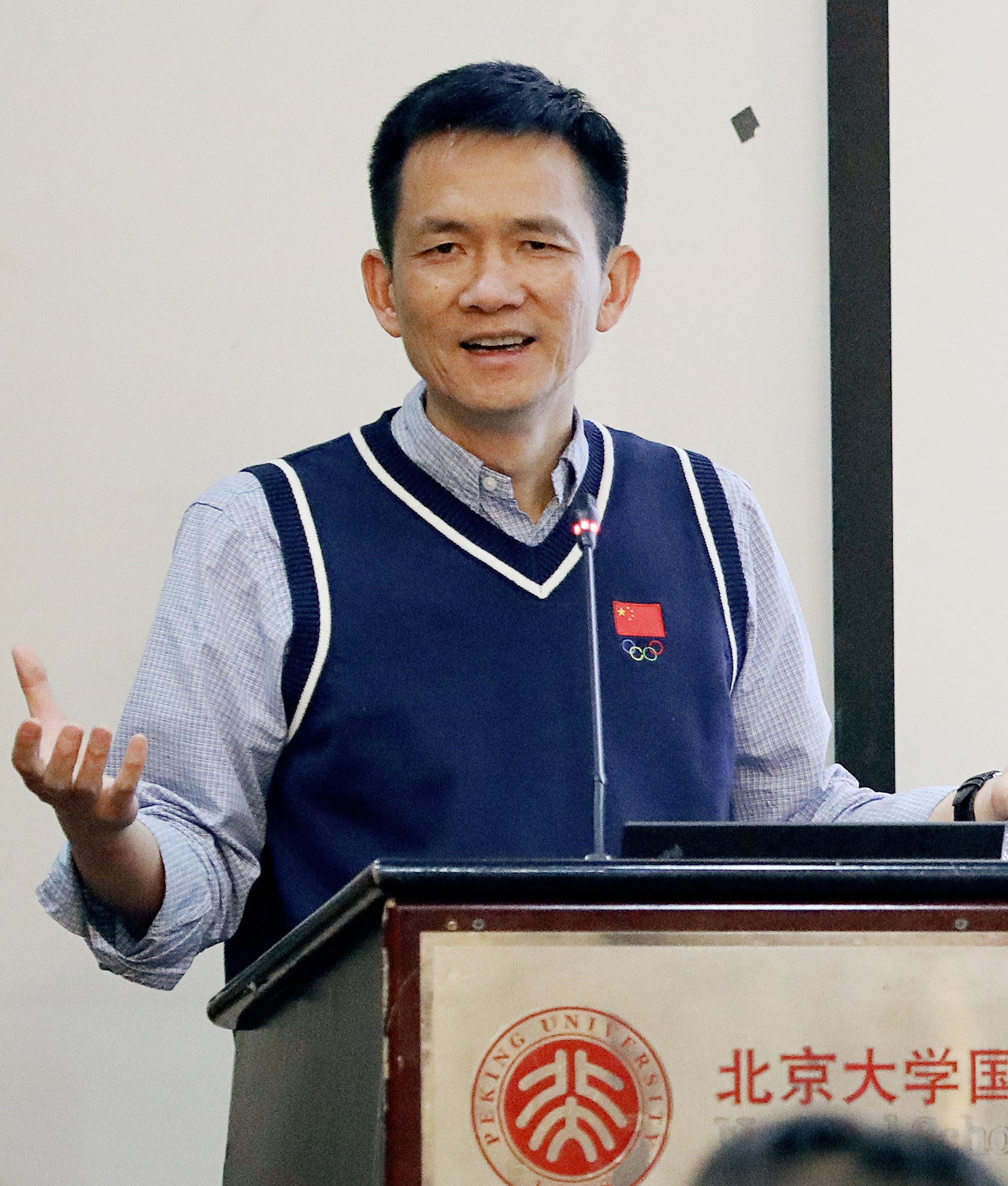
- Born: November 11, 1964 (age 61); Xi'an, Shaanxi, China
- Occupations: Economist, academic and author
- Title: Cheung-Kong Scholar Chair Professor by Ministry of Education
- Awards: Sun Yefang Economic Science Award; Pu Shan Award by Chinese Association of International Economics

Academic background
- Education: B.Sc. in Geography; M.S. in Economics; Ph.D. in Agricultural and Applied Economics
- Alma mater: Peking University; University of Wisconsin-Madison
- Thesis: Three Essays on the Implications of Market and Institutional Imperfections in Rural China

Academic work
- Institutions: Peking University

Yang Yao (Chinese: 姚洋; pinyin: Yáo Yáng; born 11 November 1964) is a Chinese economist, academic and author. He is a professor, director of China Center for Economic Research and Dean of National School of Development at Peking University. He is the executive director of the Institute of South-South Cooperation and Development and is an editor of China Economic Quarterly. Yao is also appointed by Ministry of Education as Cheung-Kong Scholar Chair Professor.

Yao's research is primarily focused on economic development and institutional change in China. He has published over 100 research papers and is the author or co-author of books including China's Private enterprise, Economic Reform and Institutional Innovation and CSR and Competitiveness in China, among others.

Yao is the recipient of several awards such as Sun Yefang Economic Science Award and Pu Shan Award. He is a member of China Economists 50 Forum and is a Richard von Weizsäcker Fellow at Robert Bosch Foundation.

== Education ==
Yao received his bachelor's degree in geography and his master's degree in economics from Peking University in 1986 and 1989, respectively. In 1996, he completed his Ph.D. studies in agricultural and applied economics from the University of Wisconsin-Madison.

== Career ==
After the completion of his Ph.D., Yao joined Peking University's China Center for Economic Research as an assistant professor. In 1999, he was promoted to associate professor and to a professor in 2002.

Yao has also held administrative appointments along with academic appointments. In 2006, he served a five-year term as the director of the Management Committee at the Institute for Social Science Survey. Yao was appointed, by the Peking University, as the director of China Center for Economic Research in 2010 and as dean of the National School of Development in 2012. He took up a position of executive director at the Institute of South-South Cooperation and Development in 2016. Yao has also taught as a visiting faculty at several universities including International University of Japan, Stanford University, New York University and University of Washington. He taught as a visiting professor at Aichi University and University of Melbourne during the 2010s. He was a visiting scholar at the Bank of Finland Institute for Economies in Transition in 2015.

Yao often writes in various magazines and newspapers including The Economist, China Daily, Project Syndicate and Financial Times. He has also been involved with several public projects having a global impact. In late 2019, Yao, along with Jeffrey Lehman and Dani Rodrik, co-convened a 'US-China Trade Policy Working Group' to devise possible solutions for the US-China trade relationship. Yao and the working group issued a joint statement and proposed a new way forward to resolve the trade conflicts between USA and China.

== Research ==
Yao has conducted extensive research on development economics, political economy and institutional change in China.

His early research includes his study on political processes and the institutional change. He presented an impossibility result for the efficiency hypothesis of institutional change in a general economic setting and a well behaved political process. By combining the social choice literature with the institutional literature, he studied the formative role of political processes in institutional changes. Yao's main institutional research focused on China's economic transformation since 1978. He explained the contemporary concepts regarding institutional changes and then presented the alternative approach to these concepts. Yao explained the general model of China's institutional transition, and proposed a formal model of institutional change involving ideological evolution and actual actions of change. He also explained the two phases of institutional changes.

Yao researched about the informal institutions, collective action, and public investment in rural China and investigated the influence of lineage groups on the expenditure of local public goods. He used data from over 200 Chinese villages and found that leaders from two largest family clans in a village contributed to the local public investment and that these leaders were supported by their clans in financing the public goods. Yao directed his research focus on political economy in the early 2000s. He authored an article about the political equality, coalition formation, and economic performance in autocracies; and explained the economic performance in an autocratic government using theory of endogenous coalition formation. He highlighted the role of social revolution in the sustainable growth of a country. Yao discussed the high performing countries after the World War II and how the revolutions in those countries led to the uprooting of old socio-political structures of agrarian economy and the establishment of a social culture that supported political equality and industrial growth. He investigated the effect of pre-tenure experience on the performance of national executives. According to Yao, the political experience gained by national executives influenced their human capital and personal power and led to competent economic governance. His cross-country research indicated a positive associated between economic growth and the pre-tenure political experience gained by national executives.

Along with political economy, Yao also focused on the governmental and economic growth. He conducted a study on rural China and investigated the influence of village elections on state taxation, fiscal sharing and the general accountably of village committee. His research indicated that elections led to an improvement in the accountability of village committee but had a negative impact on the local fiscal sharing of the village. Yao studied China's economic success in shifting its economic system from planned economy to market-based system during the Reform Era. He investigated the various strategies and decisions China undertook about the economic policies. Yao pointed to the role of government as a disinterested party as the main reason for China's economic success. He also discussed the possible reasons for the disinterested approach of Chinese government. Yao's research also placed a positive role of education on economic liberalization. He emphasized upon the role of educational background in forming ideas and beliefs of political leaders, which then impacted their decisions about economic policies. He conducted a cross-country research and found a positive association between a leader's educational background and a better implementation of liberal reforms.

Yao conducted research on the political participation of women and the gender gaps of education in China. He studied women political participation by measuring the female membership in the Chinese Communist Party (CCP). His study indicated that female political involvement in the 1950s contributed to a significant decrease in the gender education gap of the 1990s. It was found that the positive effects from female political participation can be obtained by influencing the gender perception of general population.

In response to the criticism on China's political system in the face of Covid-19 and its initial slow response in the recognition of virus, Yao authored an article interpreting China's political system and compared it with the Confucian state. According to him, governance based on Confucian teachings is in accordance with Chinese traditions and the psychological inclination of Chinese natives. Yao also discussed China's political system in the face of pandemic and presented suggestions for the implementation of checks and balances in China.

== Awards and honors ==
- 2008 - Zhang Peigang Development Economics Award, Zhang Peigang Foundation
- 2008, 2010 - Pu Shan Award, the Chinese Association of International Economics
- 2010 - Beijing Municipal Award in Humanities and Social Sciences
- 2011 - Member, China Finance 50 Forum
- 2008, 2014 - Sun Yefang Economic Science Award.
- 2014 - Outstanding Economist Award, ICBC
- 2015 - Fellow, the Chicago Council of Global Affairs

== Bibliography ==
=== Books ===
- China's Private enterprise (2001) ISBN 978-1-922144-47-8
- China's Ownership Transformation: Process, Outcomes, Prospects (2005) ISBN 978-0-8213-6237-2
- Economic Reform and Institutional Innovation (2009) ISBN 978-981-4272-71-1
- CSR and Competitiveness in China (2009) ISBN 978-7-119-05599-2

=== Selected articles ===
- Liu, Shouying, Michael Carter, and Yang Yao. "Dimensions and Diversity of Property Rights in Rural China: Dilemmas on the Road to Further Reform." World Development. 1998, Vol 26(10): 1789- 1806.
- Yao, Yang. "The Development of the Land Lease Market in Rural China." Land Economics, Vol. 76(2000): 252-266.
- Wang, Shuna and Yang Yao. "Grassroots Democracy and Local Governance: Evidence from Rural China." World Development, 2007, Vol. 29, No. 10: 1635-1649.
- Yao, Yang, and Muyang Zhang. "Subnational Leaders and Economic Growth: Evidence from Chinese Cities." Journal of Economic Growth, 2015, 20: 405-436.
- Yao, Yang, and Ninghua Zhong. "Unions and Workers' Welfare in Chinese Firms." Journal of Labor Economics, 2013, Vol. 31, No.3: 633-667.
