= Reagan–Fascell Democracy Fellowship =

Resident program

The Reagan–Fascell Democracy Fellowship Program is a resident program of the National Endowment for Democracy (NED). It is named for the 40th U.S President Ronald Reagan and the late U.S. congressman Dante Fascell. Around 16 to 20 scholars are selected per year to serve for five months at NED's International Forum for Democratic Studies.
