= Journal of Democracy =

- Discipline: Political science
- Language: English
- Edited by: William J. Dobson, Tarek Masoud

Publication details
- History: 1990–present
- Publisher: Johns Hopkins University Press (United States)
- Frequency: Quarterly
- Open access: No
- Impact factor: 4.66 (2021)

Standard abbreviations
- ISO 4: J. Democr.

Indexing
- ISSN: 1045-5736 (print); 1086-3214 (web)
- LCCN: 90640838
- OCLC no.: 33892627

Links
- Journal homepage; Online archive

The Journal of Democracy is a quarterly academic journal established in 1990. It covers the study of democracy, democratic regimes, and pro-democracy movements throughout the world. In addition to scholarly research and analysis, the journal incorporates reports from activists on the ground, updates on elections, and reviews of recent literature in the field. Writers published in the journal have included Václav Havel, the Dalai Lama, and Zbigniew Brzezinski.

The Journal of Democracy is an independent nonprofit, published by the Johns Hopkins University Press. In May 2026, the Journal entered into a partnership with Stanford University’s Center on Democracy, Development, and the Rule of Law (CDDRL), a leading research center of global, political, and economic development. The Journal of Democracy’s editors alone are responsible for all editorial decisions.

According to the Journal Citation Reports, the journal has a 4.663 impact factor as of 2021. The editors of the Journal of Democracy commission most articles but do consider unsolicited articles. The journal does not perform formal peer review on all submissions but some "are sent to outside scholars or specialists for comments and evaluation."

== See also ==
- Democratization
