= Kitamura Sae =

Japanese scholar (born 1983)

Sae Kitamura
- 北村紗衣
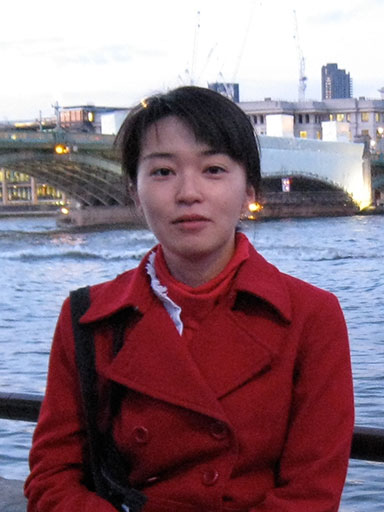
- Kitamura in 2018, at the Wikipedia:15 event
- Born: April 12, 1983 (age 43); Shibetsu, Hokkaido, Japan
- Occupations: Literary scholar, Literary critic
- Known for: 英日翻訳ウィキペディアン養成プロジェクト (English-to-Japanese Wikipedia Translator Training Seminar)
- Awards: 10th Awards of The Association for Studies of Culture and Representation, 14th Women's History Award

Academic background
- Education: King's College London; University of Tokyo; Hokkaido Asahikawa Higashi High School
- Thesis: The Role of Women in the Canonisation of Shakespeare From Elizabethan Theatre to the Shakespeare Jubilee (2013)
- Doctoral advisor: Ann Thompson and Hannah Crawforth
- Other advisors: Shōichirō Kawai and Yasunari Takada
- Influences: William Shakespeare, Oscar Wilde

Academic work
- Discipline: British literature, Literary criticism
- Sub-discipline: William Shakespeare, performing arts, feminist literature
- Institutions: Musashi University
- Notable ideas: Inner Maggie (Note: Maggie refers to Margaret Thatcher. Inner Maggie (内なるマギー) here means an oppression of "being wholeheartedly successful in a male-dominated society", or "dressing and styling in a manly way to suit a male-dominated society".)
- Website: Commentarius Saevus

Kitamura Sae (Japanese: 北村 紗衣; born 12 April 1983) is a Japanese scholar specialising in British literature and a literary critic. A graduate of the University of Tokyo and King's College London, her primary areas of research are William Shakespeare, the history of performing arts, and feminist literature. She is also an active Wikipedian, encouraging students to translate articles from English Wikipedia to Japanese Wikipedia in her classes.

Kitamura has been a professor at Musashi University since 2023. She was formerly a lecturer and associate professor at Musashi University from 2014 to 2023, and a director of the Association for Studies of Culture and Representation in 2019. Some of her works include Women Who Enjoyed Shakespeare's Plays, Sugar, Spice, and Something Explosive, and The Classroom of Critique. She also writes essays about synesthesia.

== Biography ==
=== Early life ===
Kitamura was born on 12 April 1983 in Shibetsu, Hokkaido. Her father is Kitamura Hiroshi, president of the regional newspaper Douhoku Nippou, and her grandfather is Kitamura Junjirō, former president of the Douhoku Nippou and a literary critic.

Kitamura developed her interest in William Shakespeare after watching Romeo + Juliet starring Leonardo DiCaprio. While studying at Hokkaido Asahikawa Higashi High School, she worked as a library assistant as part of her club activities. During that time, she read The Second Sex and Wuthering Heights. Her work Drive My Car Crazy, published in The Hokkaido Shimbun Press in 2001, won the "39th Arishima Junior Prize" (Japanese: 第39回有島青少年文芸賞). (Note: The "39th Arishima Junior Prize" (Japanese: 第39回有島青少年文芸賞), aimed at middle and high school students in Hokkaido, is sponsored by The Hokkaido Shimbun and supported by the Hokkaido Prefectural Board of Education in memory of Takeo Arishima. Notable past winners include Yasushi Sato, recipient of the 4th award.)

=== Shakespeare and gender studies ===
Kitamura entered the University of Tokyo after graduating from high school, and worked part-time to fund her education. She majored in Cultural Representation, graduating in March 2006. In March 2008, she completed her master's degree in Interdisciplinary Cultural Studies at the University of Tokyo, doing research on the Shakespearean play Antony and Cleopatra under the guidance of Shōichirō Kawai, and Yasunari Takada. Both are Japanese scholars on English literature. She befriended sociologist Noritaka Moriyama during this time.

Kitamura entered the University of Tokyo's doctoral program as a research fellow of the Japan Society for the Promotion of Science in April 2008. Her field of study was "Representation of Women in Elizabethan and Jacobean Tragedy" (エリザベス朝及びジェームズ朝の悲劇における女性の表象), exploring Shakespeare's place in traditional "Cleopatra literature" from antiquity to the English Renaissance, as well as examining the way women are portrayed in Shakespeare's plays, and how menstruation and pregnancy were represented during the English Renaissance. She also researched a queer reading of As You Like It interpreted by Yukio Ninagawa.

Enrolling at King's College London in October 2009, Kitamura resigned from the research fellowship to continue studying gender and Shakespeare. She has examined and analysed 800 volumes of Shakespeare-related documents from the 16th to 18th centuries, in both England and New Zealand. At the Auckland Public Library in New Zealand, she discovered letters from the previous owner of the Third Folio.

Kitamura submitted her doctoral thesis in April 2013 and was awarded a PhD in October 2013. Upon returning to Japan, she worked part-time at Yūshōdō Shoten, Keio University (from 2013, and as a part-time lecturer from 2019), and the University of Tokyo (2013–2016).

=== Musashi University ===
In 2014, Kitamura became a lecturer in the Department of British and American Studies at Musashi University. That same year, she conducted a social media study on the reception of Shakespeare's works. In October 2015, she began a column on messy (later wezzy), and published writings on synesthesia. She also began incorporating Wikipedia into her coursework.

Since 2017, Kitamura has been an associate professor at Musashi University. She has lectured on Shakespeare at Waseda University, and published a series on Shakespeare in collaboration with The Asahi Shimbun. In March 2017, Kitamura published Women Who Enjoyed Shakespeare's Plays (Japanese: シェイクスピア劇を楽しんだ女性たち —近世の観劇と読書—), which received awards from both the Association for Studies of Culture and Representation and the Women's History Award granted by Nara Women's University in 2019. She followed up with Sugar, Spice, and Something Explosive (Japanese: お砂糖とスパイスと爆発的な何か — 不真面目な批評家によるフェミニスト批評入門 —) in June 2019. The book includes columns from messy/wezzy, critiques of Frozen, Fight Club, and Vanishing Point from a feminist perspective, and discussions on Burlesque. It was ranked 18th in "Kinobes! 2020: The Best 30 Kinokuniya Bookstore Staff Recommends" (紀伊國屋書店スタッフが全力でおすすめするベスト30 キノベス！2020).

In September 2019, Kitamura published The Classroom of Critique (Japanese: 批評の教室 — チョウのように読み、ハチのように書く —), illustrated by "Tokunagaasako" (Japanese: とくながあきこ). The book defines a critic's role in both interpretation and evaluation of creative work. (Note: Kitamura defines interpretation (解釈) as "Extracting hidden meanings from a work, that may not be obvious at first glance", and evaluation (価値づけ) as "Determining the work's quality and position") One chapter features a student interaction in the editing process. According to The Nikkei, the book was reprinted four times within four months, selling 50,000 copies by January 2022.

Kitamura's research was supported multiple times by the Japan Society for the Promotion of Science through the Grants-in-Aid for Scientific Research, including "The Changes in the Perception of 'Male Beauty' in the Performance History of Early Modern English Drama" (Japanese: 近世イングランド演劇の上演史における「男性美」観の変遷) in September 2019, and "Women and Public Speaking in Early Modern England" (Japanese: 近世イングランドにおける女性とパブリックスピーキング) in April 2023. In 2020, she published an essay on the fourth wave of feminism in Gendai Shisō.

Since April 2023, Kitamura has served as a professor of the Graduate School of Humanities in both the Department of British and American Studies and in the European and American Studies Major. In June 2023, she released her collection of cultural essays, English Back Alley (Japanese: "英語の路地裏 — オアシスからクイーン、シェイクスピアまで歩く —).

From April 2024 to April 2025, Kitamura went on sabbatical leave at Trinity College Dublin in Ireland. During this time, she served as a Wikipedian in residence at the Library of Trinity College Dublin.

=== Research ===
Kitamura emphasises the importance of literature in teaching English, and encourages her students to analyse literary works from a director's perspective in university classes.

Kitamura has studied the reception of Shakespeare's works on social media, stating:

...It is not just for Shakespeare, but for all classic plays that have survived the test of time. While these plays appear to depict the past, they actually resonate with the present. (Note: Original text: シェイクスピアに限らず、時代の試練を生き延びた古典的な芝居には、過去のことを描いているようでいて実は現在に通じるところがある。)

— Kitamura Sae, William Shakespeare, the newest playwright who can do anything (Note: Original text: 今一番新しい劇作家、何でもありのウィリアム・シェイクスピア), Hakusuisha

She also analyses the business aspects of Shakespeare's works.

== As a Wikipedian ==
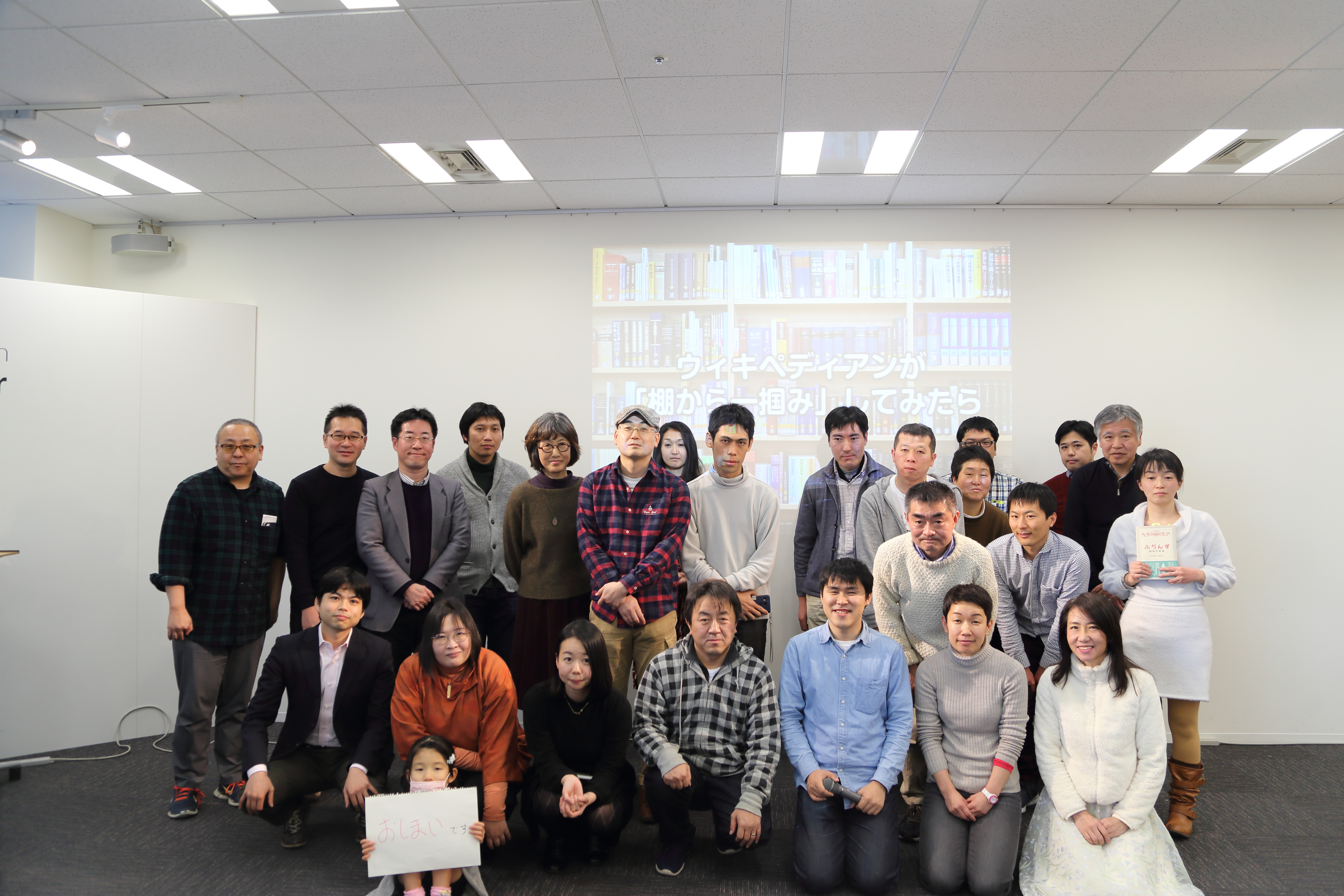
Kitamura attended a Wikipedian offline meeting in Tokyo, photographed in January 2019.

Since 2010, Kitamura has been contributing to Wikipedia under the username "さえぼー". (Note: Also known as "Saebou".) One of her key contributions is running the Wikipedia Translation Project as part of her annual university coursework. Kitamura organised a panel on editing Wikipedia at a 2016 conference of the History of Science Society of Japan, and co-hosted an academic symposium on 28 September 2019 with Harumichi Yamada and Tomoaki Watanabe, addressing the use and challenges of Wikipedia in higher education. Kitamura has participated in Art+Feminism and other edit-a-thons, and has appeared on TV and radio as a Wikipedian. She also expanded on privacy concerns of Japanese Wikipedia during the controversy surrounding the Higashi-Ikebukuro runaway car crash article.

Kitamura has addressed the issue of gender bias on Wikipedia by helping the organisation of WikiGap in 2019 and publishing a paper on the topic in 2020. In 2021, Kitamura discussed the challenges of notability for women, citing the example of Marie Curie's treatment on English Wikipedia in an interview held by the Mainichi Shimbun.

== Published works ==
According to the Japan Science and Technology Agency, Kitamura's main subjects of her work include William Shakespeare, the history of performing arts, and synesthesia. Her notable works include Women Who Enjoyed Shakespeare's Plays (Japanese: シェイクスピア劇を楽しんだ女性たち ―近世の観劇と読書―), Sugar, Spice, and Something Explosive (Japanese: お砂糖とスパイスと爆発的な何か ― 不真面目な批評家によるフェミニスト批評入門 ―), and The Classroom of Critique (Japanese: 批評の教室 ― チョウのように読み、ハチのように書く ―).

== Appearances ==
=== Magazine ===
- "北村紗衣×キャトリン・モラン 王子様を夢見るシンデレラストーリーはもうたくさん!". 週刊文春Woman (11). 文藝春秋 〈文春ムック〉: 89–92. 2021. ISBN 978-4-16-007032-5.

=== Radio programmes ===
- TBS Radio, "アフター6ジャンクション", 2019: 10 April, 3 July (ウィキペディア特集), 27 December. 2020: 27 July, 25 December. 2021: 22 September. 2022: 28 December. 2023: 23 March. 2024: September (ウィキマニア特集)
- CBC Radio, "若狭敬一のスポ音", 12 December 2020, 「光山雄一朗の気になったので聞いてみました 第5回 ウィキペデイアの知らない世界に誘います!」
- FM Yokohama, "FUTURESCAPE", 6 February 2021.
- Nippon Cultural Broadcasting, "村上信五くんと経済クン", 30 October 2021

=== TV programmes ===
- NHK, "グレーテルのかまど" at Eテレ, 5 August 2019
- TBS, マツコの知らない世界「ウィキペディアの世界」, 3 September 2019 (Note: Under her name "さえぼー" on Wikipedia.)

=== Video works ===
- Musashi University (24 November 2017), あなたも書ける、シェイクスピアの翻訳記事/北村紗衣 准教授 (夢ナビライブ2017東京) on YouTube
- Historians' Workshop (14 September 2019), 「バズる (？) アウトリーチのすすめ」1/3 (北村さん) on YouTube
- TEDx Talks (16 November 2019), Negotiating the Roles of Citizen, Spectator, and Consumer | Sae Kitamura | TEDxOtemachiED on YouTube

== Awards ==
- December 2001: "39th Arishima Junior Prize" by The Hokkaido Shimbun for Drive My Car Crazy.
- June 2019: "10th Studies of Culture and Representation Prize" (第10回表象文化論学会賞 学会賞) from the Association for Studies of Culture and Representation (Japanese: 表象文化論学会) for "シェイクスピア劇を楽しんだ女性たち".
- November 2019: 14th Women's History Award (Japanese: 第14回女性史学賞) by the Center for Gender and Women's Culture in Asia at Nara Women's University (Japanese: 奈良女子大学アジア・ジェンダー文化学研究センター), also for "シェイクスピア劇を楽しんだ女性たち".
- December 2019: Ranked 4th in "Kinokuniya Shimbum Prize" (紀伊國屋じんぶん大賞2020) by Kinokuniya for "お砂糖とスパイスと爆発的な何か".
- December 2024: UK Wikimedian of the Year 2024, Honourable Mention.

== See also ==
- List of Wikipedia people
