= Santa Monica Daily Press =

Newspaper

- Front page from April 25, 2011
- Type: Microdaily
- Format: Tabloid
- Owner(s): Newlon Rouge, Inc.
- Editor: Matthew Hall
- Founded: November 13, 2001
- Language: English
- Headquarters: Santa Monica, California 90405
- Website: smdp.com

The Santa Monica Daily Press is a free daily newspaper in Santa Monica, California. It was established in 2001 and is a newspaper of record for the city of Santa Monica

== History ==
In November 2001, the Santa Monica Daily Press was established by Dave Danforth, Carolyn Sackariason, Ross Furukawa. The three all met while working at the Aspen Daily News, a similar paper Danforth co-founded. The three founding partners were attracted to Santa Monica's similarities to Aspen and saw an opening in the market when the city's only daily, The Evening Outlook, folded.

At the Daily Press, Furukawa worked as publisher and Sackariason as editor. At launch, the paper had a 4,000 circulation and six full-time employees. In 2003, Sackariason was the first reporter on scene after the Santa Monica Farmers Market crash. In February 2018, Todd James became a partner after buying out Sackariason.

== Staff ==
Daniel Archuleta was the managing editor for seven years before his death in 2014.

=== Editors ===
- Carolyn Sackariason, 2001–2006
- Michael Tittinger, 2006–2007
- Kevin Herrera, 2008–2014
- Matt Hall, 2014–present
