= Santa Monica Farmers Market crash =

2003 road incident

Coordinates: 34.0153°N 118.4964°W

- Date: July 16, 2003 (23 years ago)
- Location: Santa Monica, California, U.S.
- Type: Vehicle-ramming attack
- Deaths: 10
- Injuries: 70
- Accused: George Weller

On the afternoon of July 16, 2003, George Weller, an American retired salesman, then age 86, drove his 1992 Buick LeSabre westbound down Arizona Avenue in Santa Monica, California, toward the city's popular Third Street Promenade. The last few blocks of the street, before it ends at the bluffs overlooking Pacific Coast Highway, had been closed to vehicle traffic for the biweekly farmers' market.

Weller's car struck a 2003 Mercedes-Benz S430 sedan that had stopped to allow pedestrians through a crosswalk, then accelerated around a road closure sign, crashed through wooden sawhorses, and plowed through the busy marketplace crowd, traveling nearly 1,000 feet (300 m) at speeds between 40 and 60 mph (60 and 100 km/h). The entire sequence of collisions took at least ten seconds.

By the time the car came to a halt, Weller had killed ten people and injured 70. Weller told investigators he had accidentally placed his foot on the accelerator pedal instead of the brake, then tried to brake but could not stop.

In November 2006, Weller was convicted of vehicular manslaughter with gross negligence. Judge Michael Johnson of Los Angeles Superior Court noted Weller's "enormous indifference" and "unbelievable callousness", further stating that Weller had "never once expressed in court any remorse for his actions." Weller's attorney Mark Borenstein stated that Weller had apologized repeatedly and was sincerely remorseful.

Johnson stated during sentencing that Weller "deserves to go to prison" but ultimately sentenced him to probation, citing his advanced age and poor health. In the sentencing statement, Johnson further stated:

“There were places along the farmers market where Mr. Weller literally threaded the needle through very narrow gaps between structures and vehicles, and in wider areas he steered his car from one side of the street to the other.... Given the choice between stopping his car by steering into an empty truck or continuing to move down the street by steering into people, Mr. Weller chose to steer into the people.”

On May 22, 2008, the Los Angeles Times reported that the City of Santa Monica had thus far paid out $21 million to settle dozens of civil lawsuits stemming from the case. The same article also noted that Weller, age 91, was now confined to his home and receiving 24-hour nursing care.

George Russell Weller died on December 9, 2010, at the age of 94 in Santa Monica, California.

== See also ==
- Sudden unintended acceleration
- List of traffic collisions (2000–present)
- Old age and driving
- Prius Missile and Higashi-Ikebukuro runaway car crash: Other traffic accidents caused by elderly drivers accidentally pressing on the accelerator pedal instead of the brake pedal
