= Maya Yamazaki =

Japanese politician (born 1974)

- 山崎 摩耶

Member of the House of Representatives
- In office 10 August 2021 – 14 October 2021
- Preceded by: Hiranao Honda
- Succeeded by: Multi-member district
- Constituency: Hokkaido PR
- In office 30 August 2009 – 16 November 2012
- Constituency: Hokkaido PR

Director of the Japanese Nursing Association
- In office 1995–2005

Personal details
- Born: 9 January 1947 (age 79) Tokyo, Japan
- Party: DPP (2021–2022)
- Other political affiliations: DPJ (2007–2012); CDP (2017–2020)
- Education: Hokkaido Asahikawa Higashi High School
- Alma mater: Hokkaido University
- Occupation: Nurse
- Website: http://maya-net.jp/

Maya Yamazaki (山崎 摩耶, Yamazaki Maya; born 10 July 1974) is a Japanese politician who served in the House of Representatives of Japan from 2009 until 2012.

== Biography ==
Born in Tokyo, Yamazaki attended Hokkaido Asahikawa Higashi High School and graduated from Hokkaido University in 1971. After receiving her nursing license in April 1968, she would later work at several health facilities, before being director of the Japanese Nursing Association from 1995 until 2005; she was in the Ministry of Health, Labour and Welfare's Social Security Council as that organization's representative. She was also a professor at the Nursing School in Iwate Prefectural University.

In 2007, she ran as a proportional district candidate for the Democratic Party of Japan with 27,500 votes.

In 2009, she was elected to the Hokkaido proportional representation block.

In 2012, she came third place running for Hokkaido's 12th district with 25,501 votes.

In 2017, she ran as a proportional district candidate for the Constitutional Democratic Party.
