= Prius Missile =

Japanese internet slang referring to Toyota Prius crashing from sudden acceleration

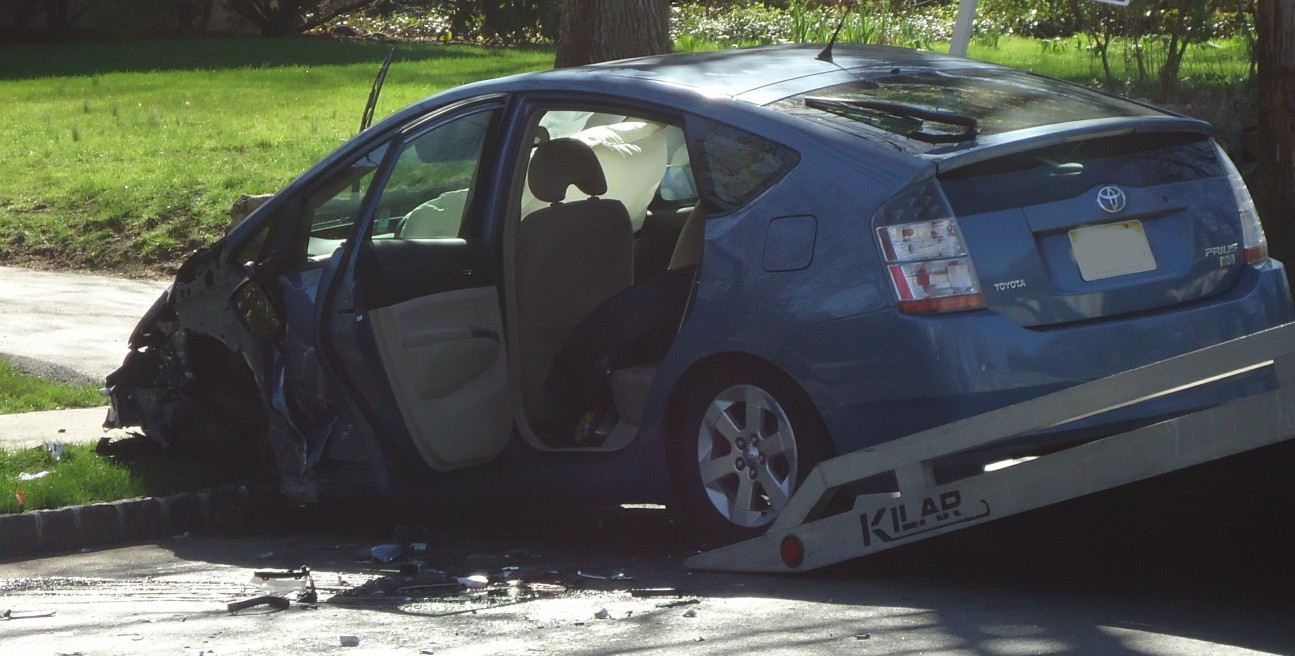
A Toyota Prius involved in a car crash

"Prius Missile" (Japanese: プリウス・ミサイル, Hepburn: Puriusu-Misairu) is an internet slang term originating from Japan in the 2010s. The term is used in Japan to describe the Toyota Prius as a "missile", as it is driven by older drivers who have been involved in traffic accidents and crashed into buildings. The slang term is thought to have emerged from the prevalence of Japanese news reports showing images of the Prius involved in traffic accidents caused by sudden unintended acceleration, such as the Higashi-Ikebukuro runaway car crash in 2019.

== Origin ==
The slang term originated in Japan towards the end of the 2010s at a time when an increase in car accidents caused by older drivers accidentally accelerating received wider attention. The internet compared the incidents of cars suddenly accelerating into buildings and crashing to that of a missile. Due to the anecdotal observation that many of the drivers involved in such accidents were driving the brand and make of the Toyota Prius, that slang evolved to incorporate the Prius with an image of a missile. The Higashi-Ikebukuro runaway car crash in 2019 was one notable example of an incident that received coverage.

According to the Ministry of Land, Infrastructure, Transport and Tourism, the accident rate of the Prius does not differ from other vehicles. Subsequent investigation of the cause of the Higashi-Ikebukuro runaway crash found that it was not caused by the failure of the 2nd Prius model.

Japanese journalist Masaki Kubota reported that the viral spread of the internet slang term and the creation of the Prius's public image as a crash-prone car is thought to be caused by several different factors, including large numbers of Prius vehicles in use in Japan, the car's popularity with older drivers, older drivers usually being overconfident in their driving skills, and the Prius's significance as a well-known car model.

== Impact and prevention ==
The slang went viral after the Higashi-Ikebukuro runaway car crash in April 2019, as the number of Google searches skyrocketed in that month. Hashtags on Twitter, like #プリウスミサイル (Prius Missile) and #今日のプリウス (Today's Prius) were seen due to the frequency of the vehicle's appearance during car crashes involving older drivers.

Toyota executive Yoshida Moritaka told shareholders in June 2019 that the company was cooperating with police investigations into the accidents and that he was personally committed to promoting a safe car society. In July 2020, the Toyota Prius PHV was equipped with features to prevent sudden acceleration. The 5th-generation Prius in 2022 also had changes in shift levers and pedals to prevent sudden accelerations.
