= Old age and driving =

Correlation between old age and driving

The correlation between old age and driving has been a notable topic for many years. In 2018, there were over 45 million licensed drivers in the United States over the age of 65—a 60% increase from 2000. Driving is said to help older adults stay mobile and independent, but as their age increases the risk of potentially injuring themselves or others significantly increases as well. In 2019, drivers 65 years and older accounted for 8,760 motor vehicle traffic deaths and 205,691 non-fatal accidents. Due to their physical frailty, older drivers are more likely to be injured in an accident and more likely to die of that injury. When frailty is accounted for, and older drivers are compared to younger persons driving the same amount, the over-representation disappears. According to the Insurance Institute for Highway Safety, a senior citizen is more likely than a younger driver to be at fault in an accident in which they are involved. The most common violations include: failure to obey traffic signals, unsafe turns and passing, and failure to yield.

Physical strength, mental acuity, and motor function begin to deteriorate as a person ages, but the degree of decline varies from person to person. There is currently no age cutoff preventing an older adult from driving in the United States. Although, there are some voluntary measures a person can utilize to check their driving abilities. According to the Centers for Disease Control and Prevention, precautionary measures include driving in daylight and good weather, planning the route before departing, and receiving an eye exam once a year. Despite these measures, often, family members of an elderly person are faced with the responsibility of trying to get them to give up driving. This can be challenging because few senior citizens are voluntarily willing to give up their freedom to drive.

Most state laws allow senior citizens to continue driving provided they meet the same requirements as younger adults. Some states require persons above a specified age to take certain tests when renewing their licenses, up to and including a road test, or to receive a physician's certificate stating they are medically fit to operate a motor vehicle. Some older adults may be permitted to drive, but with added limitations such as the amount of driving they can do, the hours in which they can drive, or the distance from home they can travel. These restrictions may be placed either by the law or their insurance provider, which vary by state.

As the process of aging varies from one person to the next, the age at which an elderly person's ability to safely operate a motor vehicle declines varies between persons. This creates controversy in regulating driving in the elderly. Some see senior citizens as among the safest drivers on the road, as they generally do not speed or take risks, and they are more likely to wear seatbelts. Others believe there should be increased testing to ensure older drivers are capable of safe driving.

The AARP staunchly opposes testing elderly drivers on the basis of age as age discrimination and argues the decision to retire from driving should be left to the individual.

== Senses, physical abilities, and cognition ==
There are a multitude of conditions that correlate with old age and have negative effects on the senses, physical abilities, and driving capabilities.

The following are two senses that are important for safe driving:

- Vision: With aging, the lens of the eye loses its transparency and becomes cloudy, a condition commonly known as cataracts. This increases the light scattering by the eye's optical system and is associated with causing disability glare and increased risk of being involved in a crash. Other common age-related vision conditions that can affect driving performance are glaucoma and macular degeneration. Glaucoma leads to peripheral vision loss and blindness in advanced disease.
- Hearing: Age-related hearing loss or presbycusis is a common condition in people over the age of 65. Studies have shown that elderly with hearing loss are more likely to be involved in crashes and commit traffic violations. Additionally, older drivers with hearing loss demonstrate worse driving performance in the presence of distractors than those with good hearing and restricted driving mobility.

Physical abilities such as motor skills are important for driving ability:

- Motor skills: Aging causes decreased physical abilities, such as gross and fine motor skills and reflexes, thereby rendering the driver physically unable to perform at a safe level. As age increases, there is a reduction in muscle mass and elasticity, bone mass, central and peripheral nerve fibers. These partly explain why an elderly motorist may drive more slowly.

Cognition is reduced with age and affects driving ability.

- Cognition: Reduced cognition can occur due to mental conditions that are associated with old age, including Parkinson's disease, Alzheimer's disease, and dementia. These conditions can impair one's ability to drive.

== Signs of impairment ==
An aging person may have some issues admitting they are no longer fit to drive. It may be difficult to talk with a loved one with a driving impairment, but it is essential to communicate the importance of safety when operating a motor vehicle.

The following are considered signs that an elderly person's driving may be impaired:

- Confusion while driving somewhere
- Having two or more minor accidents in a short period of time
- Thinking the speed limit is too high
- Others not feeling comfortable riding in a vehicle with the driver

Aging individuals should be asked the following questions:

- When driving, do objects such as parked cars or pedestrians catch them by surprise?
- Do they have difficulty seeing other cars before the driver honks? Do they get honked by other drivers for reasons you don't understand?
- Do they have limited neck rotation?
- Are their reflexes slower and reaction times longer than they used to be?
- Do they ever feel momentarily confused, nervous, or uncomfortable while driving?
- Has a family member ever suggested that they should stop driving?
- Do you have a low-contrast sensitivity? For example, do they have trouble seeing a grey car at dusk, a black car at night, or a white car on a snowy roadway?
- Is your visual acuity on a 20/20 scale below the minimum level required by your state?

== Growing concern ==
The number of older drivers on the road is growing and is bound to increase rapidly as more baby boomers become seniors. According to an AARP spokeswoman, by 2030 over 78 million boomers will be 65+, and research shows that men will outlive their driving abilities by six years and women by 10.

A 2003 Gallup showed that 89% of Americans were in favor of increased testing requirements of individuals over the age of 65. However, support for a driving age restriction under 70 years old was met with less than 10% support among those surveyed, whereas 64% of respondents believed there should be no age limits at all.

Approximately 9,000 senior-aged drivers died from driving accidents in 2019, and more than 200,000 were treated in the emergency department for driving-related injuries. Gallup reported that more Americans believed teenagers pose a greater driving risk than adults over the age of 75. Studies have shown that the highest driving accidents rates are among drivers aged less than 20 and those greater than 65. However, drivers above the age of 85 are 3 times more likely to be in a fatal crash compared to those aged less than 20, and 20 times more likely than drivers aged less than 60.

== Becoming a safer driver ==
There are some changes that older drivers can adopt to help some conditions that come with aging.

- Physical therapy can improve strength and flexibility in elderly individuals who have trouble turning their heads while driving.
- Eye doctors can prescribe glasses or contact lenses to help with vision-related conditions.
  - Older drivers should avoid driving at night if they have trouble seeing in the dark.

== Driving rules for older drivers in the United States ==
The 50 states differ in their laws governing drivers' licenses for older adults:

License Renewal Laws in the United States
State	License Renewal Laws for younger adults	License Renewal Laws for older adults
Alabama	All licenses are renewed every four years.	No additional rules for older drivers.
Alaska	All licenses are renewed every five years.	At age 69, licenses cannot be renewed by mail.
Arizona	All licenses expire at age 65 and then renewed every 12 years.	At age 70, renewal cannot be done by mail.
Arkansas	All licenses are renewed every four years.	No additional rules for older drivers.
California	All licenses are renewed every five years.	At age 70, licenses are renewed with in-person examination (written test and eye exam).
Colorado	All licenses are renewed every 10 years.	At age 70, licenses are renewed with in-person examination (written test and eye exam).
Connecticut	All licenses are renewed every six years.	No additional rules for older drivers.
Delaware	All licenses are renewed every eight years.	No additional rules for older drivers.
District of Columbia	All licenses are renewed every eight years.	At age 70, licenses must be renewed in person with clearance from a doctor.
Florida	All licenses are renewed every eight years.	At age 80, licenses are renewed six years with eye exam.
Georgia	All licenses are renewed every eight years.	At age 59, licenses are renewed every five years and after age 64 an eye exam is required.
Hawaii	All licenses are renewed every eight years.	At age 72, licenses are renewed every two years.
Idaho	All licenses are renewed every eight years.	At age 64, licenses are renewed every four years.
Illinois	All licenses are renewed every four years.	At age 75, license renewal requires a road test and eye exam. At age 81, license renewal occurs every two years. At age 87, license renewal occurs annually.
Indiana	All licenses are renewed every six years.	At age 75, licenses are renewed every three years. At age 85. licenses are renewed every two years.
Iowa	All licenses are renewed every five years.	At age 70, licenses are renewed every two years.
Kansas	All licenses are renewed every six years with eye exam.	At age 65, licenses are renewed every four years.
Kentucky	All licenses are renewed every four years.	No additional rules for older drivers.
Louisiana	All licenses are renewed every four years.	At age 70, licenses must be renewed in-person.
Maine	All licenses are renewed every six years.	At age 40, a vision test is required for first renewal. At age 65, licenses are renewed every four years.
Maryland	All licenses are renewed every eight years.	At age 40, a vision test is required for every renewal.
Massachusetts	All licenses are renewed every five years.	At age 75, licenses must be renewed in-person with an eye exam or vision screening.
Michigan	All licenses are renewed every four years.	No additional rules for older drivers.
Minnesota	All licenses are renewed every four years.	No additional rules for older drivers.
Mississippi	All licenses are renewed every eight years.	No additional rules for older drivers.
Missouri	All licenses are renewed every six years.	At age 70, licenses are renewed every three years.
Montana	All licenses are renewed every eight years.	At age 75, licenses are renewed every four years.
Nebraska	All licenses are renewed every five years.	At age 72, licenses must be renewed in-person.
Nevada	All licenses are renewed every four years.	At age 71, licenses must be renewed in-person with an eye exam or by mail with an eye examination certificate.
New Hampshire	All licenses are renewed every five years.	No additional rules for older drivers.
New Jersey	All licenses are renewed every four years.	No additional rules for older drivers.
New Mexico	All licenses are renewed every four or eight years with a vision test.	At age 67, licenses are renewed every four years. At age 75, licenses are renewed annually.
New York	All licenses are renewed every eight years.	No additional rules for older drivers.
North Carolina	All licenses are renewed every eight years.	At age 66, licenses are renewed every five years.
North Dakota	All licenses are renewed every four years.	At age 78, licenses are renewed every six years.
Ohio	All licenses are renewed every four years.	No additional rules for older drivers.
Oklahoma	All licenses are renewed every four years.	No additional rules for older drivers.
Oregon	All licenses are renewed every eight years.	At age 50, license renewal requires vision screening.
Pennsylvania	All licenses are renewed every four years.	No additional rules for older drivers.
Rhode Island	All licenses are renewed every five years.	At age 75, licenses are renewed every two years.
South Carolina	All licenses are renewed every ten years.	At age 65, licenses are renewed every five years and require a vision test.
South Dakota	All licenses are renewed every five years.	No additional rules for older drivers.
Tennessee	All licenses are renewed every five years.	No additional rules for older drivers.
Texas	All licenses are renewed every six years.	At age 79, licenses must be renewed in-person. At age 85, licenses are renewed every two years.
Utah	All licenses are renewed every five years.	At age 65, licenses renewal requires an eye exam.
Vermont	All licenses are renewed every four years.	No additional rules for older drivers.
Virginia	All licenses are renewed every eight years.	At age 80, license renewal must occur in person with an eye examination.
Washington	All licenses are renewed every five years.	At age 65, licenses must be renewed in-person.
West Virginia	All licenses are renewed every five years.	No additional rules for older drivers.
Wisconsin	All licenses are renewed every eight years.	No additional rules for older drivers.
Wyoming	All licenses are renewed every four years.	No additional rules for older drivers.

== EU validity and health checks ==
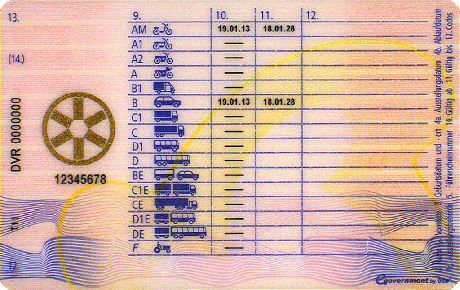
An Austrian 15 years driving license

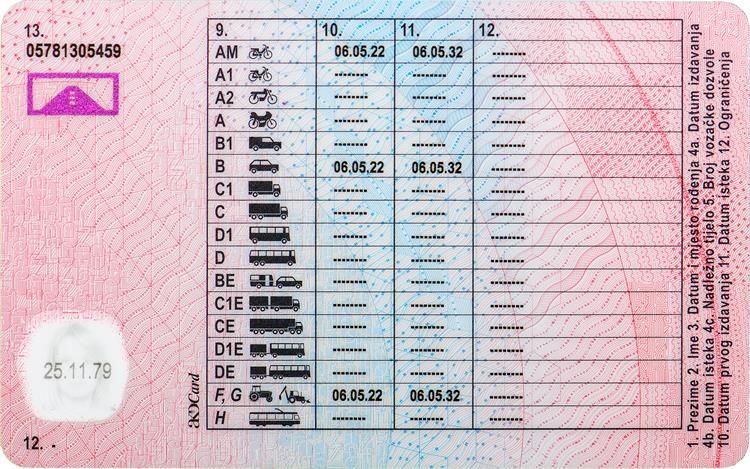
A Croatian 10 years driving license

Europe and the United States differ in the way people move. Two common ways of moving are by car and being a pedestrian. It is expected that future generations will have more extended use of the vehicle and drive longer distances.

In Europe, it is considered that a test procedure that results in people losing their driving license when they can still drive a car safely is undesirable for a variety of reasons: the fatality rate for older cyclists and pedestrians is many times larger than for older drivers. This makes them safer in a car.

In 2024, the European Parliament debated this topic due to "current road safety issues" known as "the aging of the population." The driver association 40 Millions d'Automobilistes considered this proposition as "ill-advised," "inadmissible," and "unacceptable."

In 2025, the European Union, Parliament, and Council negotiators agreed new driving licenses should be valid for 15 years for motorcycles and cars, with possible national reductions to 10 years in some cases and every five years for truck and bus licenses. EU countries can shorten the validity of driving licenses of older drivers (65 years and older). For car drivers or motorcycle riders, some EU countries could substitute the medical check with alternative measures such as self-assessment forms.

== Effects of giving up driving ==
The operation of a private vehicle is essential to life in many places, especially to one's independence. After losing their ability to drive, an older adult may be forced to make major lifestyle changes, often unable to perform activities they once could. The following effects have been noted in former drivers.

Health effects

- Reduced physical mobility and functioning due to decreased exercise and participation in outside activities.
- Increased risk of developing depression.
- Increased acceleration of cognitive decline.
- Increased mortality risk (4-6 times more likely to die as drivers).

Social effects

- Increased risk of social isolation.
- Decreased social health (i.e., social engagement, social contacts/support, social satisfaction).
- Increased admittance to long-term care facilities.

The inability to drive increases caregivers' dependence on social and medical transportation. According to the National Aging and Disability Transportation Center, family caregivers spend approximately 5 hours a day arranging or providing transportation for senior family members. This increased caregiver responsibility can conflict with work or other life demands, often resulting in an inability to help seniors.

Where available, some senior citizens may turn to public transportation or paratransit for medical appointments and personal needs. Though individuals can find alternative means of transportation, these alternatives may be more limiting than one's own car.

=== Senior-friendly transportation ===
Because giving up driving is viewed by older people as losing their independence, many may be reluctant to seek out alternative forms of transportation when they can no longer drive. The best way for transit providers to meet the transportation needs of most older Americans is to meet the transportation needs of the general adult population. Their needs are similar to those of other age groups: shopping, getting to work, medical appointments, visiting restaurants, and visiting friends. Seniors are looking for travel services that provide control, autonomy, and choice. The National Center on Senior Transportation (NCST) states that 83% of older Americans agree that public transit provides easy access to the things that they need in everyday life.

Self-driving cars have also been proposed as an alternative for senior citizens who cannot drive. However, studies have shown that autonomous vehicles have not gained acceptance among some older adults.

==== Five A's of Senior-Friendly Transportation ====
The Beverly Foundation developed these five aspects to greater encompass the necessary requirements to create a senior-friendly transportation alternative:

- Availability: This alone is not the solution to transportation challenges for older adults. Most public and community transportation systems require passengers to get to a transit stop or curb to use their services, and senior-friendly transportation must be different. The same limitations that make it difficult/impossible for seniors to drive can also make it difficult for them to get to the transit stop or the curb or even to get on or off a vehicle without assistance.
- Acceptability: This suggests senior passenger criteria of comfort and convenience of service. Seniors may have higher standards for transportation because they are used to their personal vehicles. Senior-friendly transportation needs to recognize these standards to which it is being measured.
- Accessibility: Passengers must be able to access the service and the vehicle. The system must take services to the passengers and offer them assistance and support prior to, during, and following their travel, coined as "door-to-door, door-through-door, and at-the-destination assistance."
- Adaptability: This calls for the service to meet the assistance needs of older adults. Multi-stop metro and bus rides are more difficult for older people because they lack flexibility, which is essential for senior-friendly transportation. The service also needs to accommodate the use of walkers and service animals.
- Affordability: Aims for transportation to be affordable to passengers and transportation services. Research shows owning and operating an automobile can cost between $5000 and $7500 a year. However, when older adults can no longer drive, they rarely convert savings in automobile ownership into funds they can use for another transportation option. Senior-friendly transportation systems have the job of educating older people about alternative options and helping them to understand that these costs are not an additional expense but a substitute for the cost of a personal automobile.

== See also ==
- Old man's car
- Santa Monica Farmers Market crash
