= Kozo Iizuka =

Japanese engineer (1931–2024)

Kozo Iizuka (飯塚 幸三, Iizuka Kōzō; IPA: [iizuka koː(d)zoː]; June 1, 1931 – October 26, 2024) was a Japanese engineer who served as Director of the AIST and President of the International Measurement Confederation and Human Frontier Science Program among other positions.

On April 19, 2019, while driving his car, he caused a fatal accident that resulted in deaths of two people and injuries of nine people (including his wife on the car) in what is called the Higashi-Ikebukuro runaway car crash.

== Life and career ==
He was born in Nakano in Tokyo in 1931. He graduated from the University of Tokyo. He became a Doctor of Engineering in 1972.

He was president of the National Institute of Advanced Industrial Science and Technology and vice-president of Kubota corporation. While vice-president of Kubota, he also served as chairperson of a committee of the Science Council of Japan.

== Higashi-Ikebukuro runaway car crash and trial ==
On April 19, 2019, while driving his Toyota Prius in the Ikebukuro district of Tokyo, Iizuka ran a red light and struck and killed a mother and daughter who were on a bicycle (Mana Matsunaga, 31, and her daughter Riko, 3), injured eight others at a pedestrian crossing, and his wife, who was riding with him. The reported cause of the crash was Iizuka stepping on the accelerator when he meant to apply the brake. About a year before the incident, Iizuka had received treatment on his right knee and was advised by his doctor to drive as little as possible.

In spite of Iizuka having caused a fatal crash, he was not arrested. Police stated that this was because Iizuka was injured at the scene and was elderly, and hence was not expected to run away or attempt to destroy evidence. However, in similar crashes caused by elderly drivers that have occurred in Japan following Iizuka's, each and every suspect has been arrested almost immediately, regardless of their age and state of health. This has led to widespread scrutiny and criticism of the police in Japan in regard to just how impartially they enforce the law.

One of the victim's parents started a campaign demanding that police prosecute Iizuka in line with normal practice, collecting 390,000 signatures. The petition was submitted to the National Police Agency of Japan. On November 12, 2019, the Traffic Investigation Division of the Tokyo Metropolitan Police Department referred Iizuka to prosecution on suspicion of causing fatal injury by negligent driving. Iizuka claimed that there was a mechanical problem with the brake and/or accelerator, but vehicle function tests revealed no mechanical defects. The Metropolitan Police Department concluded that negligent driving by Iizuka was the cause of the crash. In February 2020, he was prosecuted.

Following the crash, Iizuka reportedly explained that he was hurrying in his car to a French restaurant where he had made a lunch reservation, concerned that he and his wife would be late.

Hearings began on 8 October 2020, in which Iizuka continued to deny the charges, claiming that the car had malfunctioned, and saying that he had no memory of accelerating the car. On 4 March 2021, a 25 year veteran engineer from the car's manufacturer testified that they found no problems with the car's parts, but the defense continued to profess that it was a malfunction. Iizuka continued to insist that he did nothing wrong at the trial on June 21, 2021.

Iizuka's closing statement at the trial was that he "did not remember mistaking the accelerator for the brakes". The prosecution asked for seven years of incarceration at the sentencing hearing on July 15, 2021, the maximum allowed for the charge of manslaughter caused by negligent driving.

Iizuka was sentenced to 5 years imprisonment on 2 September 2021 by the Tokyo Regional Court. Neither Iizuka nor the prosecution appealed the sentence by the deadline of September 17, so the sentence was confirmed. The husband and father of the woman and child killed by Iizuka, Takuya Matsunaga, commented saying that, while it does not feel sufficient given how Iizuka spent the last two years making nonsensical claims, it is the maximum allowed, and that he is thankful to the prosecution for it.

Iizuka's 2015 medal, the Order of the Sacred Treasure for Administrative Services in International Trade and Industry, was revoked after he accepted a sentence of five years in prison.

=== Public response ===
In interviews with the media, Matsunaga criticized Iizuka for not looking him in the eye when apologizing to him, and also questioned the sincerity of the apology, given how Iizuka continued to claim that he was not at fault. The case drew an unusual amount of attention due to the leniency Iizuka was treated with, and criticism that he was being treated as a notional "upper-class citizen" (Japanese: 上級国民, Hepburn: jōkyū kokumin), to whom regular rules do not apply. Many people pointed out that the Japanese police immediately arrest regular people, who are without such status or influence, but did not arrest Kozo Iizuka because of his social standing until pressured to do so by the public.

In analyzing the reactions to the incident, Toyo Keizai commentator Atsushi Manabe writes that Iizuka's words and actions after the crash "added fuel to the fire", and as a result the case represents to people how "unapologetic liars and coldblooded psychopaths succeed more than regular honest people, which goes against the zeitgeist of the common people". Manabe further writes that this "victory of brazen shamelessness" represents a loss of morals, and is why people feel disgust and anger as well as a belief that the case represents how Japanese law no longer functions as it should, with criminals being able to get away with their crimes by using their privileged positions in society. The case renewed attention to the issue of crashes caused by elderly drivers which had been a contentious topic for several years before. In the aftermath of the crash, a record number of elderly drivers voluntarily surrendered their driver licenses.

A documentary covering the case aired on Tokyo Broadcasting System Television on 4 April 2021.

=== Japanese Wikipedia article controversy ===
Following the incident, attention was drawn to Iizuka's article in Japanese Wikipedia, which goes in-depth into his accomplishments, but had no mention of the incident at the time in September 2020. Whether the incident should be mentioned on the article resulted in edit wars and discussions that were subsequently reported on by Asahi Shimbun.

== Death ==
Iizuka died in prison due to old age on October 26, 2024.

== See also ==
- Higashi-Ikebukuro runaway car crash
