= Seidosha =

Japanese publishing company

- Status: Active
- Founded: 1969
- Founder: Yasuo Shimizu
- Country of origin: Japan
- Headquarters location: Tokyo
- Distribution: Japan
- Publication types: Books and journals
- Nonfiction topics: humanities and Social science
- Official website: https://www.seidosha.co.jp/

Seidosha (青土社) is a publisher of academic books in the humanities and social sciences. Its magazines, Yuriika (which covers poetry and art) and Gendai Shisō (which covers thought and philosophy), are well-known academic magazines in their respective fields, with prominent scholars and researchers contributing papers and essays to them.

== Magazines ==
- Yuriika (Eureka) (1969–present)
- Gendai Shisō (Contemporary Thought) (1973–present)
- imago (1990–1996)
