= Japanese Wikipedia =

Japanese-language edition of Wikipedia

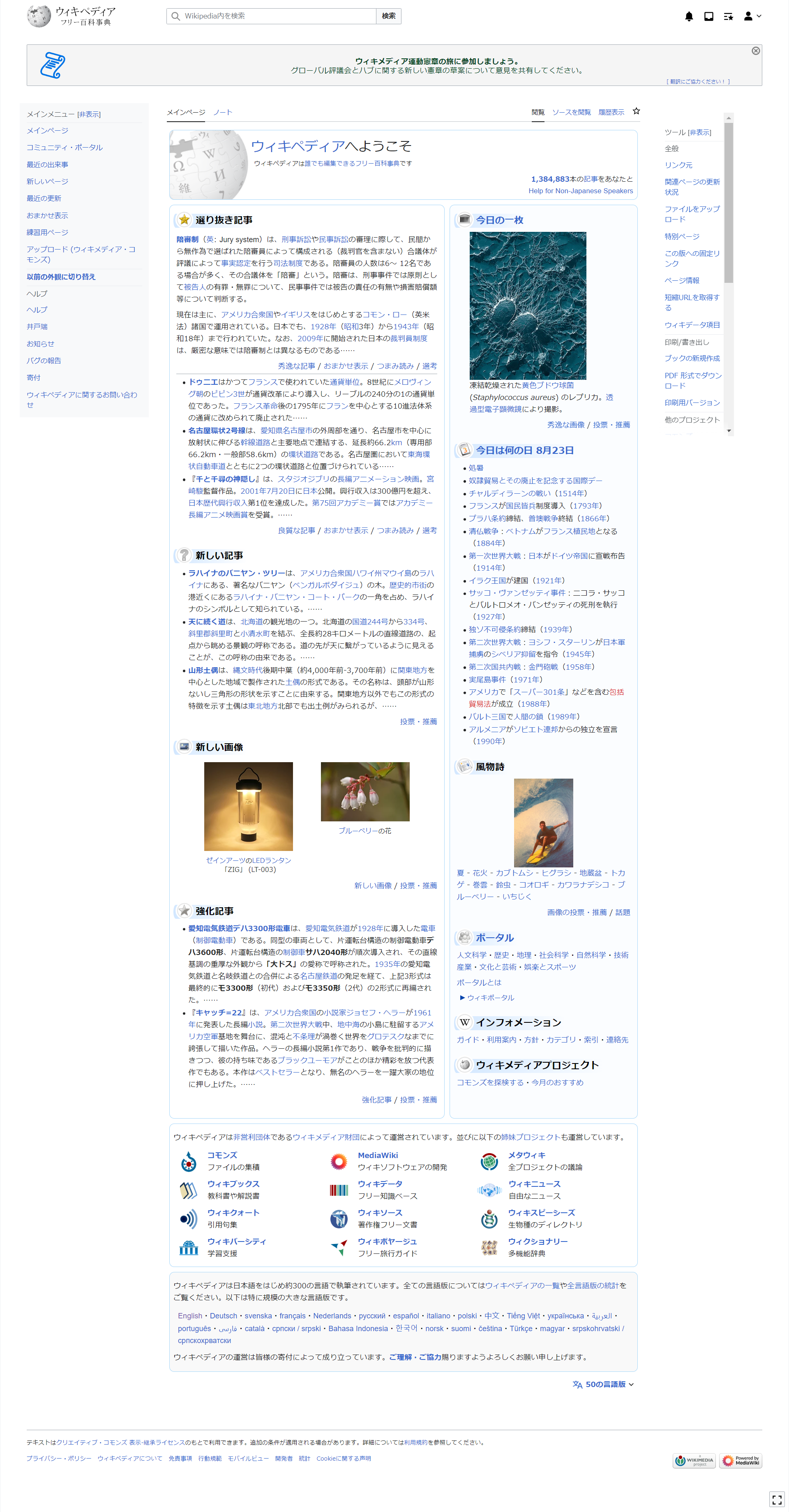
- Screenshot Main page of the Japanese Wikipedia in August 2023
- Website type: Online encyclopedia
- Available in: Japanese
- Owner: Wikimedia Foundation
- Website: ja.wikipedia.org
- Commercial: No
- Registration: Optional
- Users: 2.8 million (as of 7 November 2026)
- Launched: 11 May 2001; 25 years ago
- Current status: Active
- Content license: Creative Commons Attribution/ Share-Alike 4.0 (most text also dual-licensed under GFDL); Media licensing varies

The Japanese Wikipedia (Japanese: ウィキペディア日本語版, Hepburn: Wikipedia Nihongoban; lit. 'Wikipedia Japanese version') is the Japanese edition of Wikipedia, a free, open-source online encyclopedia. Started on 11 May 2001, the edition attained the 200,000 article mark in April 2006 and the 500,000 article mark in June 2008. As of 7 November 2026, it has 1,526,492 articles with 23,160 active contributors, ranking sixth in the latter metric behind the English, Spanish, German, French and Italian.

As of November 2024, the Japanese Wikipedia is the world's second most visited Wikipedia language edition after the English Wikipedia; it has been the second most viewed Wikipedia during most periods since at least 2008. It has a high proportion of anonymous contributors and one of the lowest admin-to-user ratios of any Wikipedia language edition. The Japanese edition is one of the best Wikipedias in retention of new editors and has one of the lowest edit revert rates.

The Japanese Wikipedia has been accused of historical revisionism by a number of scholars, especially its pages on World War II. Its culture has been described as hostile and heavily influenced by the anonymous textboard 2channel.

== History ==
In March 2001, three non-English editions of Wikipedia were created, namely, the German, Catalan and Japanese Wikipedias. The original site address of the Japanese Wikipedia was http://nihongo.wikipedia.com and all pages were written in the Latin alphabet or romaji, as the software did not work with Japanese characters at the time. The home page also showed an early attempt at creating a vertical text.

The first article was named "Nihongo no Funimekusu" (meaning "Phonemics of the Japanese language"). Until late December in that year, there were only two articles.

=== Awards ===
In September 2004, the Japanese Wikipedia was awarded the "2004 Web Creation Award Web-Person Special Prize" from the Japan Advertisers Association. This award, normally given to individuals for great contributions to the Internet in Japanese, was accepted by a long-standing contributor on behalf of the project.

== Characteristics ==
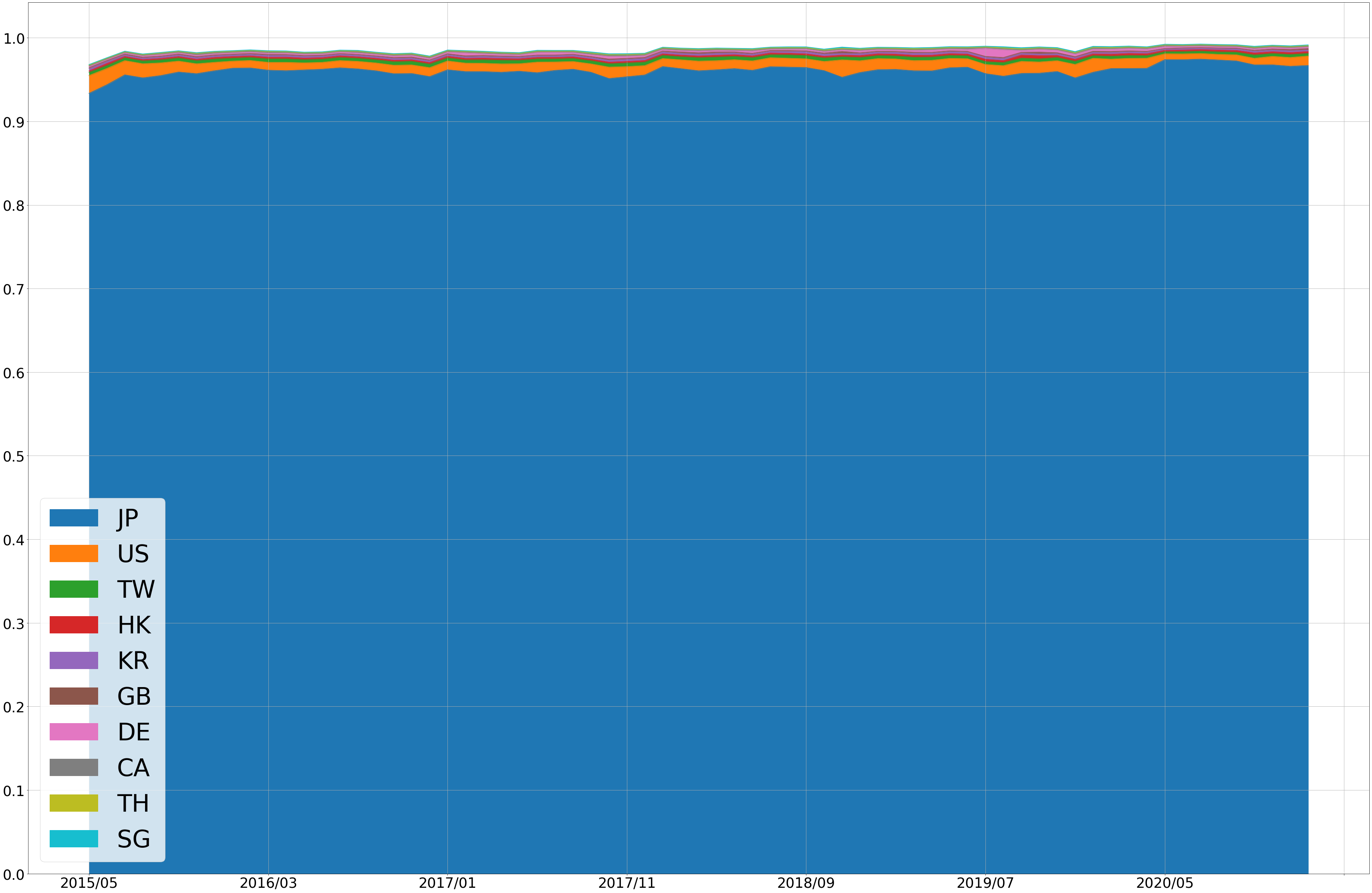
Origin of viewers on the Japanese Wikipedia

The Japanese Wikipedia is different from the English Wikipedia in a number of ways.

=== Editing ===
- An edit is kept only if it is legal under both Japanese and United States laws, to account for the fact that the vast majority of contributors live in Japan. This has two major consequences:
  - The fair use provisions of US law are not considered to be applicable. Articles and media files which do not have a GFDL-compatible license are prohibited, even if they would be legal under the "fair use" doctrine in the US.
  - Materials considered illegal cannot be kept in the archive, even reverted by oneself but caught in history archive. If an illegal edit is inserted between valid versions, an admin may make specific revisions inaccessible from the history.
- Quotation is discouraged. There is controversy over the GFDL compatibility of quotations. Articles that contain quotations will be deleted unless they meet all the following legal requirements:
  1. The source is clearly referred to.
  2. The quotation is necessary.
  3. The quoting and quoted works can respectively be regarded as the principal and subordinate both in quantity and quality.
  4. The quoting and quoted works are clearly distinguishable.
- Cut-and-paste moves within Wikipedias, including merging, splitting, and translation from another language, are not allowed unless the original article source and date is explicitly referred to in the edit summary, because such moves are considered to be GFDL violations. Articles created in such a manner will be deleted. A comparable policy is in place on the English Wikipedia, but it is only casually enforced.
- Editors on the Japanese Wikipedia generally do not create independent lists of volumes of manga, or episodes of anime; however, there are exceptions, e.g. ja:Q.E.D. 証明終了のエピソード一覧 and ja:ONE PIECEのアニメエピソード一覧. Articles about manga works usually do not contain lists of chapters. Also lists of episodes of anime embedded in related articles and independent lists of episodes of anime do not contain plot synopses.

=== Community ===
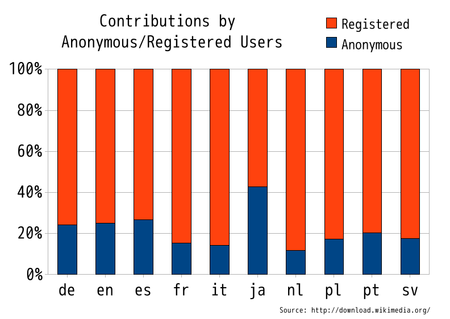
The Japanese Wikipedia has the most anonymous contributions as compared to other major languages in Wikipedia. The image is as of December 2007.

- Anonymous contributions are high compared to other major language versions of Wikipedia (see graph).
- The Japanese Wikipedia has the lowest number of administrators per active editors (only 0.16%).
- Edit wars are strongly frowned upon. Articles may be protected as a result of an edit war with as little as three or four edits. Protected pages will not be unprotected unless someone explicitly requests it. Perhaps because of this, as of September 2005 the Japanese Wikipedia had the second-highest number of articles protected for over two weeks, after the German Wikipedia. In May 2008, 0.0906% of articles were fully protected (only editable by admins), which was by far the highest percentage among the ten largest Wikipedias. Articles on sensitive topics, such as Japanese war crimes and current territorial disputes, are almost always under lengthy protection.
- On 18 April 2010, there was a proposal to create a new namespace specifically for WikiProjects to shorten the name of a WikiProject. This proposal finally passed and a new namespace named "プロジェクト:" (Project:) was created for WikiProjects on 20 September the same year (UTC).
- The edition stresses the fact that it is not a news bulletin, and discourages edits on current events.
- The Japanese Wikipedia is Japan-centered, due to the fact that the overwhelming majority of editors are Japanese people, nearly all living in Japan. When referring to places outside Japan they are often called "overseas", and references to Japanese perspective on articles are common. They are trying to discourage this tendency.
- It ranks among the best Wikipedias in retention of new editors and also has one of the lowest edit revert rates.

=== Policies ===
- Articles will be deleted if they contain the names of private citizens, unless they are public figures (under section B-2 of Japanese deletion policy). For example, an article about Shosei Koda, a Japanese citizen kidnapped in Iraq, does not refer to him by name, but former Prime Minister Yasuo Fukuda's name may be mentioned due to his public position. Convicted criminals and their victims are considered private citizens, even if the case was extensively covered in Japanese media, and their names may not be published until their death.
- The Japanese edition of the English policy Ignore All Rules (directly linked to one of Five Pillars) is neither a policy nor a guideline.
- The Japanese edition of the English Wikipedia how-to guide How to write a plot summary is a formal guideline.
- The Japanese edition of the English Wikipedia page Handling trivia (which is an explanatory supplement to the Manual of Style guideline on trivia sections) is a formal guideline as well.
- The Japanese edition of the English banning policy is not a policy, for lack of an Arbitration Committee.
- Toukou Burokku Irai (Requesting for Block), which has no corresponding rules in English Wikipedia, is frequently used. And often well-known editors who have been active for a long time are blocked indefinitely. The blocked user may appeal for lifting the block, as in the case of blocking in English Wikipedia.
- There is no local chapter of the Wikimedia Foundation in Japan.

== Culture ==
Andrew Lih wrote that influence from 2channel resulted in many Japanese Wikipedia editors being unregistered and anonymous. Because of the lack of registered editors, Japanese Wikipedia editors as a whole interact less with the international Wikipedia community and the Wikimedia Foundation than editors of other Wikipedias do. Lih also wrote that Japanese Wikipedia editors are less likely to engage in edit wars than editors on Wikipedias of Western languages, and typically they would instead make alternative drafts of articles on their own userspaces.

Jimmy Wales pointed out at a conference in 2009 that the Japanese Wikipedia was significantly more dominated by articles about pop culture than other Wikipedia projects, and according to one of his slides, "barely 20 percent" of the articles on the Japanese Wikipedia were about anything else. The Japanese Wikipedia was known to have relatively few moderators as of 2010, and this characteristic has not changed as of 2025.

Nobuo Ikeda, a public policy academic and media critic in Japan, suggested in 2006 an ongoing "2channel-ization" phenomenon on the Japanese Wikipedia. Ikeda argued that by allowing anonymous editing, the community spawns a type of culture seen in anonymous message boards such as 2channel, where hate speech, personal attacks, and derogatory expressions are common and are also the source of entertainment. He also remarked on the "emotional-outlet" and "get rid of stress" aspects of Japanese Internet culture, where 90% of blogs were anonymous, the opposite of the U.S. where 80% of blogs were authored under real names.

In 2006, Naoko Kizu (木津 尚子), a Japanese Wikipedian, stated that on the Japanese Wikipedia most people start out as page editors and uploaders of images, and that the majority of people continue to serve in those roles. Some people apply to become administrators. Kizu said "Unfortunately, some apply for this role out of a desire for power! And then are surprised when they get rejected."

There are threads of textboards named "【百科事典】ウィキペディア第d刷【Wikipedia】" (lit. '[Encyclopedia] Wikipedia Part d Edition [Wikipedia]') related to the Japanese Wikipedia on 2channel. In these textboards, the Japanese Wikipedia community informally discuss with other editors anonymously. On Twitter, they use accounts associated with their username and "#jawp" for mentioning the Japanese Wikipedia.

== Controversies ==
Attention was drawn to the Japanese Wikipedia article on Kozo Iizuka (飯塚幸三), which used to describe his accomplishments in detail, with no mention of how he killed a woman and her young daughter in the Higashi-Ikebukuro runaway car accident that made him a household name in Japan. An administrator applied protection to the article and later explained that the Japanese Wikipedia community takes legal risks arising from potential privacy violations very seriously, as there is no local chapter of the Wikimedia Foundation to support them in court.

=== Allegations of historical revisionism ===
In a 2018 book, Florian Schneider of Leiden University compared and contrasted the articles on the Nanjing Massacre in the Chinese Wikipedia, Baidu, and the Japanese Wikipedia (南京事件). Schneider was critical of some aspects of each version, but noted that a 2015 version of the Japanese article attempted to justify the rape and murder of Chinese civilians by claiming Japanese soldiers were doing it in the context of apprehending Chinese defectors. Schneider also noted that there were also few to no images on the article; instead it contained a single image of Japanese soldiers checking Chinese prisoners of war for weapons.

In a 2019 paper, Karl Gustafsson of Stockholm University compared various Chinese and Japanese Wikipedia articles. Gustafsson was critical of aspects of both versions. For the Nanjing Massacre article, Gustafsson noted that the first paragraph of the Japanese version expressed doubt about the details of the incident and "thereby portrays the Japanese military less negatively". For the article on the Battle of Shanghai, Gustafsson noted that the Japanese article generally emphasized violence by the Chinese combatants against both Japanese soldiers and civilians, while omitting mentions of civilian deaths from Japanese air raids. Gustafsson described the Japanese article as framing the Japanese invasion of the city as a reaction to Chinese aggression.

In a 2021 article published in Slate magazine, Yumiko Sato argued that several Japanese Wikipedia articles contained historical revisionism and whitewashing. Notable articles mentioned included those on the Battle of Hong Kong (香港の戦い), comfort women (日本の慰安婦), the Nanjing Massacre (南京事件), and Unit 731 (731部隊). A Wikipedia editor and academic, Sae Kitamura, responded to Sato's article. While acknowledging that historical revisionism is indeed an issue on the Japanese Wikipedia, she pointed out factual errors in Sato's argument that centered around Wikipedia policy. In a talk sponsored by the Wikimedia Foundation, Kitamura argued that the revisionism was, in part, the result of a severe shortage of administrators. Kitamura argued that, to combat this, more competent users needed to be attracted and the toxicity of the website needed to be controlled.

In a 2021 article, professor Chelsea Szendi Schieder of Aoyama Gakuin University described Japanese Wikipedia's coverage of World War II as right-wing revisionism, and argued there was a divergence between right-wing narratives that are popular online in Japan and academic writings in English.

== Studies ==
=== 2022 study on IP editing ===
In 2022, a report on IP editing on the Japanese Wikipedia was submitted to the Wikimedia Foundation. The report, based on interviews with Japanese Wikipedians, claimed that the Japanese Wikipedia's culture was seen as antagonistic, hostile, and susceptible to being manipulated by cliques. One Japanese Wikipedian interviewed said, "I think the Wikipedia community is similar to 2Chan in a negative way; it's just as hostile. You can get viciously attacked for what you write". An interviewee alleged that an editor and administrator collaborated to manipulate the website, which resulted in the Wikimedia Foundation investigating the situation.

Some users felt that having an account created more vectors for being antagonized and thus avoided logging in. One interviewee claimed to mainly make minor edits, as large edits were more likely to invite attacks. Interviewees felt that IP users had significant sway over the website's content and toxic atmosphere. The community reportedly held numerous discussions on if and how to regulate IP users, but failed to reach consensus due to polarized opinions. Most of the interviewees felt that IP editing was not an issue on the site.

=== 2023 study on historical revisionism ===
At the 10th Wiki Workshop on 11 May 2023 hosted by the Wikimedia Foundation, Taehee Kim, David Garcia, and Pablo Aragón analyzed which articles were controversial on the Japanese Wikipedia. They found that articles on the "Historical recognition and post-war settlement" portal were particularly reverted, and that of the top 20 most controversial articles, 11 were related to Japanese war crimes and topics commonly associated with Japanese right-wing ideology. They also performed a network analysis of editors who mutually reverted other edits in general, and found that those editors were more likely to be editors of articles discussing topics susceptible to right-wing revisionist narratives.
