= Upper-class citizen =

Japanese buzzword

The upper-class citizen (上級国民, jōkyū kokumin) is a Japanese buzzword used mainly on the Internet to refer to privileged people who are apart from commoners. In 2015 and 2019, the term was nominated for the New Words and Buzzwords of the Year Awards, sponsored by the publisher Jiyukokuminsha.

== Meaning ==
There is no clear definition of the term; it can simply refer to the wealthy and upper class in some cases, or it can also refer to politicians, professionals, and bureaucrats who say and do things that are beyond the comprehension of the general public. Additionally, it can refer to the group of people that use political, financial, or other forms of power to escape their criminal activities and social responsibilities.

== History ==
The term upper-class citizen spread rapidly since allegations in 2015 that the emblems of the 2020 Tokyo Olympics and Paralympics infringed on copyrights. It was subsequently used online and elsewhere in the report of the February 2018 accident in Minato Ward, Tokyo, and the fatal April 2019 Higashi-Ikebukuro runaway car crash.

=== Development of Tokyo Olympic and Paralympic emblems ===
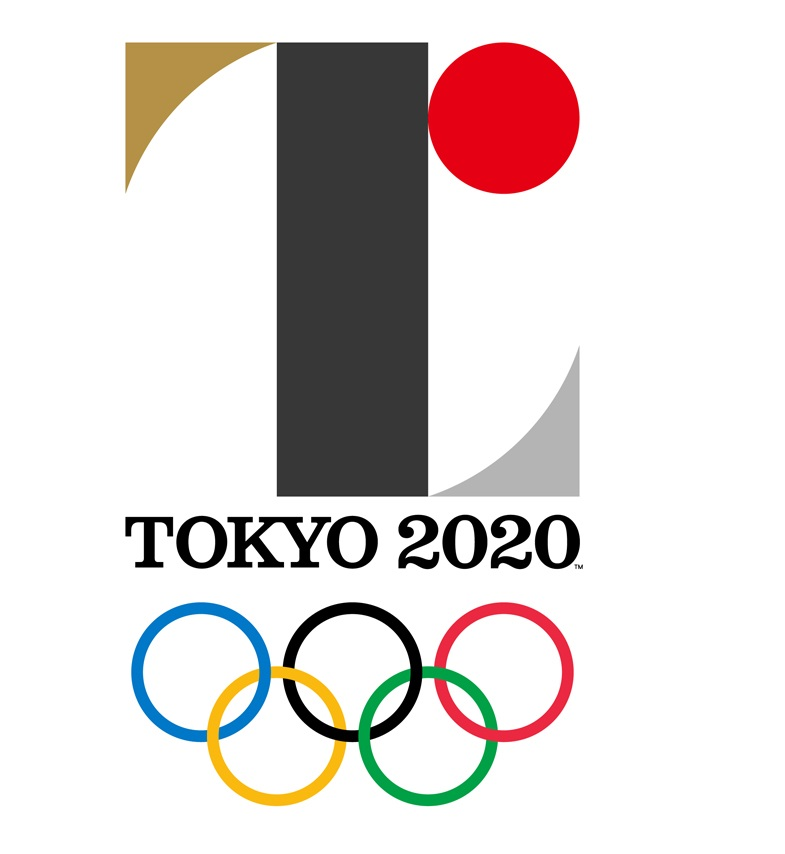
Emblem designed by Kenjiro Sano

In 2015, allegations of copyright infringement were raised in the development of Tokyo 2020 Olympic and Paralympic Games emblems. The Tokyo Organizing Committee of the Olympic and Paralympic Games (TOCOG) held a press conference, and the media and Internet users reported it using upper-class citizen. TOCOG originally selected Kenjiro Sano's design, but due to turmoil from the summer to the fall of 2015, it withdrew Sano's design on September 1, 2015.

At the press conference announcing this decision change, Toshiro Muto, Secretary-General of the Olympic Organizing Committee, stated that the uniqueness of the design "can be understood by experts, but, unfortunately, not by the ordinary citizen" — citing the comment of Kazumasa Nagai, Chairman of the Selection Committee. During his comment, Muto used the term "ordinary citizen" (一般国民, ippan kokumin) multiple times, and the opposite term upper-class citizen was chosen to ridicule this sense of elitism in the designer world. Muto's statement provoked a backlash as being condescending.

According to Ameba News, these sentiments were widely spread, supported by the fact that upper-class citizen was one of the top HOT words on Twitter. It was also used in the print media by Nikkan Gendai on September 5 as a comment by freelance writer Toshiyuki Inoue: "The emblem uproar is not going down, but rather it is shifting to a conflict between the powerful people called upper-class citizens and the ordinary lower-class citizens." Nikkan Gendai also used upper-class citizen in its September 5 issue as a cover term to include Nagai and other designers who were involved in the emblem selection process. These incidents led to the 2015 nomination of upper-class citizen for the New Words and Buzzwords of the Year Awards.

=== Higashi-Ikebukuro fatal runaway car crash ===
On April 19, 2019, a car went out of control in Higashi-Ikebukuro, Tokyo, killing a 31-year-old woman and her 3-year-old daughter who were using a pedestrian crossing and injuring ten people, including the driver and his wife. The driver was Kozo Iizuka (87 years old at the time), a retired technical officer of the Ministry of Economy, Trade and Industry (METI) and a former vice-president of Kubota Corporation. However, Iizuka was not arrested and was sent to a hospital instead. The term upper-class citizen was used on the Internet concerning this perpetrator's social status and received preferential treatment.

By contrast, two days later, a male driver was caught red-handed for driving a city bus that plowed into a line of pedestrians in Chuo Ward, Kobe City, killing two people and injuring four. On May 8 of the same year, a female driver was arrested at the scene of an accident in Otsu City, Shiga Prefecture, where two nursery school children were killed.

Furthermore, Iizuka was reported in the press as a "former government official" or "former director" and not as a "suspect". Because he was a high-ranking bureaucrat in the former Ministry of International Trade and Industry (MITI) and also served as a chairman of an industry association and a director of a major machinery manufacturer even after leaving MITI, the perceived special treatment of him drew sharp criticism. As a result, the word upper-class citizen was nominated for the 2019 New Words and Buzzwords Award. In connection to this, the book Upper-Class Citizen/Lower-Class Citizen by Akira Tachibana (published by Shogakukan), released in August of the same year, reached a circulation of 130,000 copies.
