= Automobile products liability =

When a person makes a claim for personal injury damages that have resulted from the presence of a defective automobile or component of an automobile, that person asserts a product liability claim. That claim may be against the automobile's manufacturer, the manufacturer of a component part or system, or both, as well as potentially being raised against companies that distributed, sold or installed the part or system that is alleged to be defective.

== United States ==
=== History ===
A major foundation for modern awareness of the defects found in automobiles was laid when Ralph Nader published his book Unsafe at Any Speed about the Chevrolet Corvair and defects found in other vehicles. A focus of this book was the car manufacturers' intentional choice of saving a few dollars for each car instead of providing safe design and manufacture of their products, as well as avoiding the adding of devices which would protect car occupants from injury.

The Ford Pinto gas tank cases present another instance of saving money at the cost of serious injury to consumers. In Grimshaw v Ford, the California Court of Appeal upheld a jury verdict of $2.5 million in compensatory damages and $125 million in punitive damages (reduced to $3.5 million by the trial court as a condition of denying a motion for new trial). The jury found that Ford Motor Company had known about the unsafe design of the gas tank used in the Pinto, and that this design was an intentional choice by Ford which decided to use a cheaper design which knowingly greatly increased the risk of fire in a rear-impact accident, rather than a more expensive design which would have prevented the death of an occupant.

=== Safety regulations ===
The National Transportation Safety has recognized the danger of rollovers, and the prevalence of rollovers as a result of the defect created by the design of many SUVs. NHTSA has actively campaigned against this design defect and has adopted and promoted its rollover safety and vehicle safety ratings, and has actively promoted the adoption of electronic stability control systems.

Roof pillars may appear strong to the average consumer, but might collapse in a rollover event. Designs exist to reinforce these pillars at little additional cost. Vehicle design is supposed to depend on a structural support system that creates a "survival space" that protects car occupants in a crash from injury due to roof crush. A weak roof makes a vehicle defective, and roof crushes can cause serious injuries. In 1973, the government passed Federal Motor Vehicle Safety Standard 216, creating a standard roof strength test to measure the integrity of roof structure in motor vehicles. Despite federal standards, some vehicle roofs may crush by a foot or more during a rollover accident.

== Common defect claims ==
Among the problems with design or manufacture that may give rise to an automobile product liability claim are the following:

- Inadequate passenger restraints: An occupant of a vehicle is at increased risk of injury if the restraint system, including active restraints such as seat belts and passive restraints such as airbags, fail to keep the occupant in his or her seat, or fail to prevent the passenger from being ejected from the vehicle. Such a failure may cause or contribute to serious injury and death in what might otherwise have been an accident with minor injuries or without injury. Beside seat belts, the most important injury prevention devices in the car are front and side impact airbags.
- Vehicle instability: An unstable vehicle may be subject to rollover accidents. During the 1990s and early 2000s, there were a large number of accidents that involved vehicle's rolling over. This type of issue led to a product liability claims against a number of SUV models, which had a higher-than-normal center of gravity. Because they are taller and narrower, SUVs, or sports utility vehicles, are three times more likely to roll over in an accident than are other passenger cars.
- Roof crush: When a vehicle rolls over and ends up on its roof, the weight of the vehicle may cause the roof of the vehicle to collapse, potentially crushing the occupants of the vehicle. Roof crush injury risks are higher in vehicles with a greater propensity to roll over. Roof crush kills or injures thousands of people every year.
- Tires: Problems with a vehicle's tires may result in the unexpected loss of control of a vehicle, due to such problems as reduced traction or a sudden loss of tire pressure during operation of the vehicle. Defects in the design or manufacture of a tire may result in tire tread separation of sidewall failure, even during normal use. Incorrect maintenance information provided by a manufacturer may cause a vehicle owner to overinflate or underinflate tires, reducing safety.
- Unintended acceleration: A defect with the vehicle's accelerator or the layout of the pedals results in unwanted or accidental acceleration of the vehicle. Pedal layout issues led to product liability claims against the Audi 5000 in the United States, and more recently in a massive 2010 Toyota Vehicle Recall and suspension of production and sales of many of the most popular Toyota models.
- Dangerous modification: A vehicle may be altered by a dealership or third party service center for reasons relating to appearance and performance. Some vehicle alterations, such as raising or lowering a vehicle, or the use of third party after-market parts and accessories that may not be approved for use on passenger vehicles, may affect the safety and stability of the vehicle. Other alterations may distract or confuse other drivers, potentially increasing the chance of an accident.
