= Old man's car =

Stereotype of car that appeals to older buyers

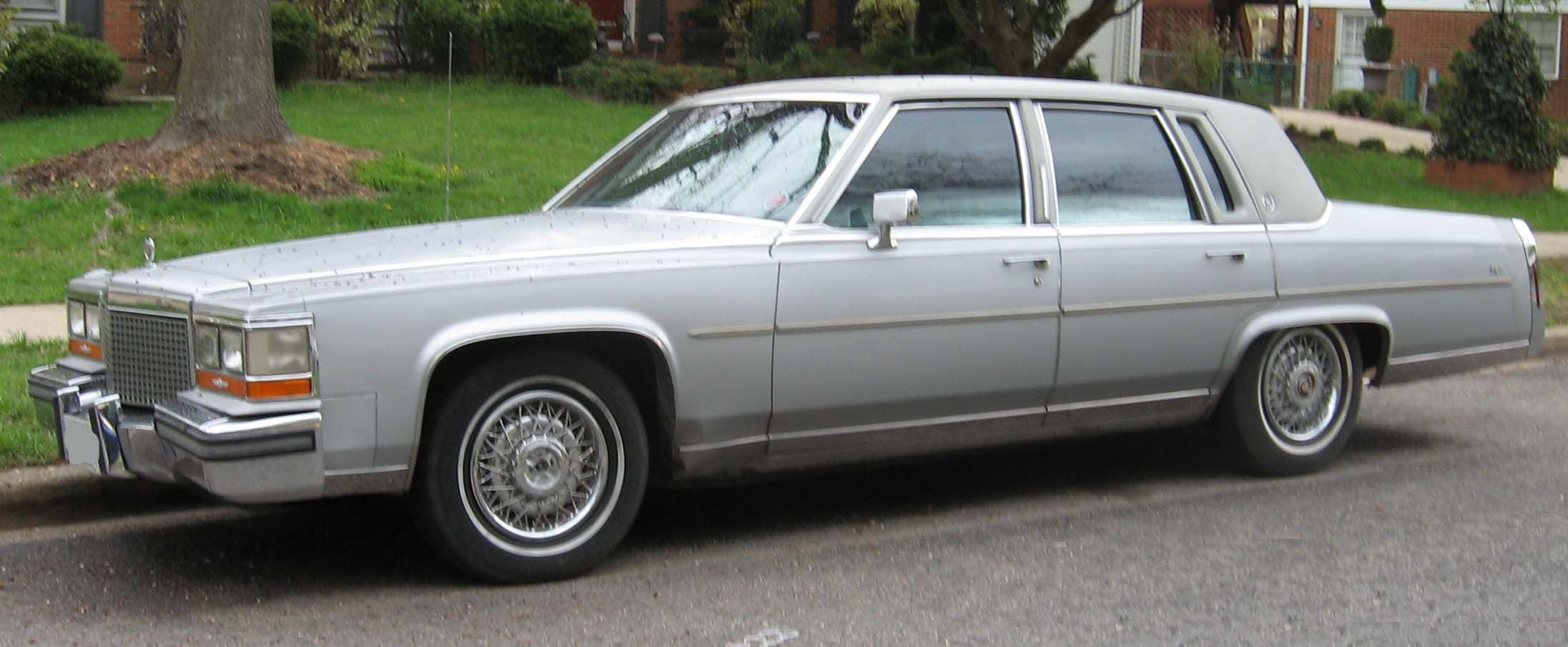
1988 Cadillac Brougham. Large vehicles such as the Brougham have become stereotypical "old man's cars" due to their appeal to older consumers.

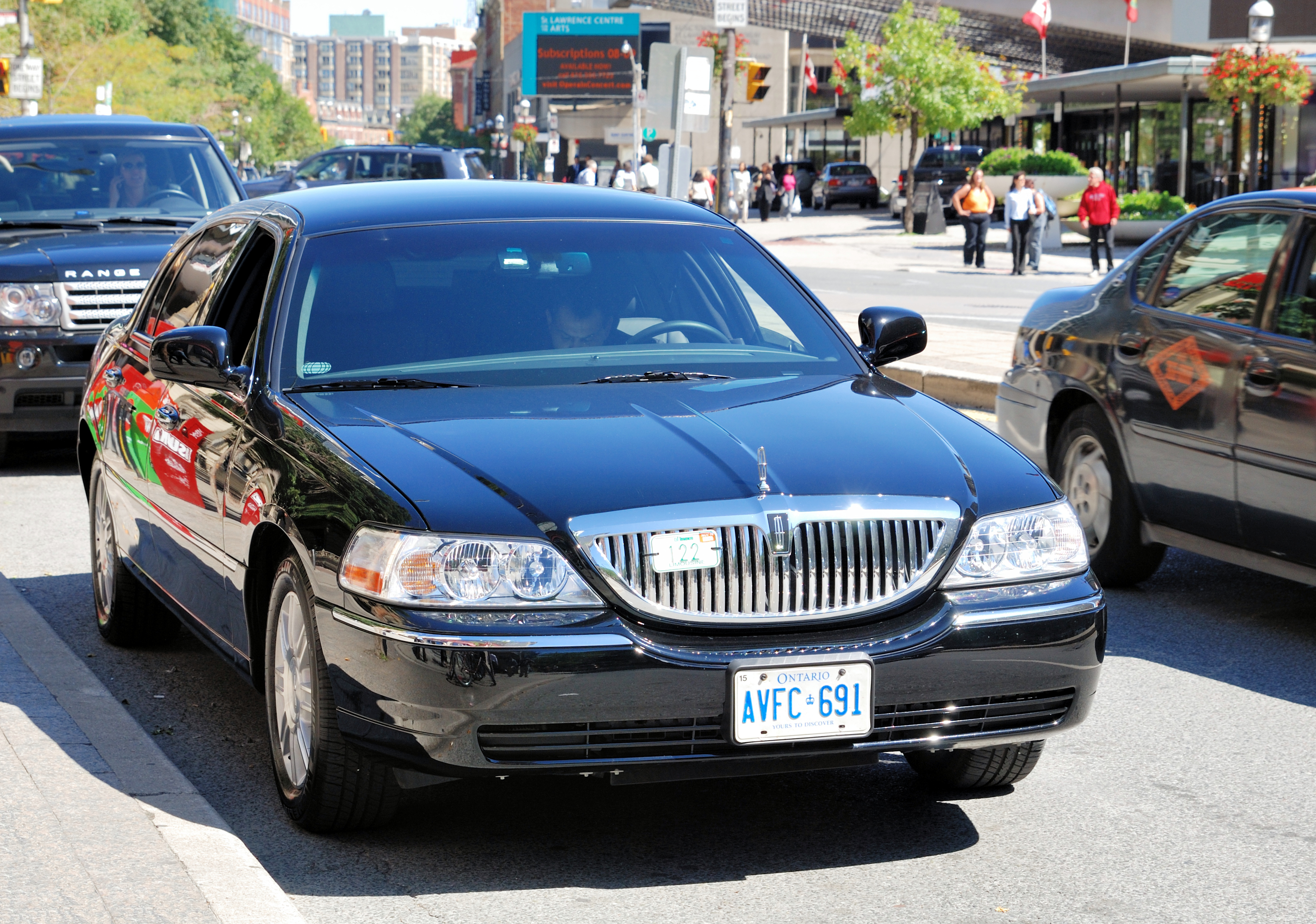
Lincoln Town Car. Before ending production in 2011, approximately ninety percent of Town Car buyers were over the age of 65.

An old man's car (or old person's car or old folk's car) is a stereotype of a car that appeals to older buyers rather than to younger ones. This stereotype is prevalent in the United States, and mostly involves full-size American sedans. It is widely known in the American automobile industry that such cars are difficult to sell for the younger demographic. Several automobile manufacturers have taken steps to shake the perception that their cars are intended for an older generation because it tarnishes the brand's image in the eyes of younger buyers.

== Market focus ==
Two automobile company executives are associated with the adage that "You can sell a young man's car to an old man, but you cannot sell an old man's car to a young man": Lynn A. Townsend, who became president of Chrysler in 1961, and Semon Knudsen who became General Manager of Pontiac in July 1956. Knudsen espoused this philosophy during the changes that he made to Pontiac from 1957 to 1959, which began with the release of the Bonneville, intended to be a high-profile announcement to the U.S. public that Pontiac was "no longer an old man's car company". Townsend had two teenage sons, who, according to Hoover (the engineering coordinator for the engineering division for the race programme in 1961), when Townsend took on the position of president, "made it known to dad straightaway that this stuff was nowhere. He was highly sensitive to the fact that the product line was nowhere out there with the young people." Townsend used this rationale in his directive to change the image of the product line in October 1961.

== Advertising ==
Ford employed this adage in its advertising for the Ford Focus in the United States. One advertisement showed a group of youths climbing out of the rear of the car after having pulled into a parking space too narrow for them to open the side doors. Another showed a similar group of youths nervously holding coffee cups as the car passed over a series of railway tracks. Mueller observes that Ford "could just as easily have demonstrated the ease of entry or exit for a cane user [...] or a number of other features especially useful for drivers with limitations due to age or disability", but chose not to because that would be attempting to sell features that appeal to older people to young people, whereas the campaign that Ford went with actually sold features that appeal to younger people to both younger and older people.

Similarly, while most buyers of Honda cars are in the 40 to 60 age range, the advertising for the cars "portrays youthful activities and targets a youth mindset" (in the words of American Honda's national advertising manager).

Oldsmobile automobiles had, by the 1990s, long been branded as "old man's cars" and "Buick clones". John Rock became the chief executive in 1992, and by January 1993 was implementing a strategy to bring in younger buyers that comprised (in Rock's words) "throw[ing] out old brands and creat[ing] new ones" and becoming more "Saturn-like". (In a 2006 interview, Robert Lutz, vice-chairman of General Motors said that for the Saturn "you don't have to overcome preconceived public notions", whereas the fact that Buick "is an old person's car is a notion that's constantly reinforced by the media", making it easier to grow a brand like Saturn.) One part of doing so was an advertising campaign aimed at shedding the old man's car preconception, involving the slogan "This is not your father's Oldsmobile." Kassof states that the advertising campaign was a flop, and further opines that it may indeed have backfired, reinforcing and even introducing the old man's car preconception in the minds of those people who had not previously thought of Oldsmobile vehicles as being such. GM eventually successfully courted younger buyers with the Buick brand, following the phaseout of Oldsmobile in 2004 and the phaseout of Saturn and Pontiac in 2010 after GM's bankruptcy.

== Availability ==
As manufacturers have increasingly shifted towards SUV's rather than sedans, and attracting younger buyers, there is now less choice of elderly-friendly cars than there were in the early 2000s. In the United States, manufacturers sponsor events that typically attract younger people with cars styled to attract drivers who seek a contemporary design. Manufacturers are reluctant to be seen as producing vehicles for the older generation and the reputation that comes with it. Traditionally, brands such as Buick, Cadillac, and the Lincoln-Mercury line were the top choices for older buyers, however sales of cars to older buyers have increased more towards the basic versions of mainstream vehicles.

== Adaptations ==
Car makers have gradually been adapting vehicles to be elderly-friendly, without necessarily targeting these features at older drivers. For instance, larger door handles and improved lighting are beneficial to the older driver while being discreet enough that younger drivers will not associate the changes with older age. An ergonomics supervisor at Ford suggested in 2003 that the company are not aiming to build cars specifically for older people, because they will not buy them. Instead, discreet changes to lighting or technologies such as parking aids are designed to help drivers of all ages. Although car makers are increasingly adding gadgets that can aid older drivers, little thought is given as to how they may be a distraction to older drivers.

== See also ==
- Old age and driving
