= Sudden unintended acceleration =

Uncontrolled acceleration of a vehicle

Sudden unintended acceleration (SUA) is the unintended, unexpected, uncontrolled acceleration of a vehicle, often accompanied by an apparent loss of braking effectiveness. It may be caused by some combination of driver error (such as pedal misapplication), or mechanical or electrical problems. The US National Highway Traffic Safety Administration estimates 16,000 accidents per year in the United States occur when drivers intend to apply the brake but mistakenly apply the accelerator.

== Definition and background ==
In the 1980s, the U.S. National Highway Traffic Safety Administration (NHTSA) reported a narrow definition of sudden acceleration only from near standstill in their 1989 Sudden Acceleration Report:

"Sudden acceleration incidents" (SAI) are defined for the purpose of this report as unintended, unexpected, high-power accelerations from a stationary position or a very low initial speed accompanied by an apparent loss of braking effectiveness. In a typical scenario, the incident begins at the moment of shifting to "Drive" or "Reverse" from "Park".

The report is taken from a study begun in 1986, in which the NHTSA examined ten vehicles suffering from an "above average" number of incident reports and concluded that those incidents must have resulted from driver error. In the lab tests, throttles were positioned to wide open prior to brake application in an attempt to replicate the circumstances of the incidents under study. However, the newest vehicle involved in the study was a 1986 model and no test vehicles were equipped with the electronic control (drive by wire) systems common in 2010. All vehicles were equipped with automatic transmissions, that is, no vehicles had manual transmissions with left foot clutch pedal disengagement of engine power.

These tests were meant to simulate reports of the time suggesting that the vehicles were at a standstill and accelerated uncontrollably when shifted from park. With modern drive by wire fuel controls, problems are believed to occur exclusively while the vehicle is under way.

General Motors cars of the 1950s with automatic transmissions have the R for reverse at the furthest clockwise position in the rotation of the column-mounted shift lever. L for low position is just adjacent as the lever moves one notch counterclockwise. Because it is very easy to select L, a forward position when desiring R, to reverse, there are many unintended lurches forward while the driver watches toward the rear, expecting to reverse the automobile. By the 1960s, gear selection arrangements became standardized in the familiar PRNDL, with reverse well away from the forward positions and between the Park and Neutral selections. The elimination of push-button drive control on all Chrysler products began after 1965 to eliminate the ease of selecting an unintended direction.

The most prominent incidents of sudden unintended acceleration took place from 2000–2010 in Toyota and Lexus vehicles, resulting in up to 89 deaths and 52 injuries in the USA. The NHTSA first opened an auto defect investigation into Toyota vehicles in 2004, but the Office of Defects Investigation (ODI) within the NHTSA closed the investigation citing inconclusive evidence. Toyota also claimed that no defects existed and that the electronic control systems within the vehicles were unable to fail in a way that would result in an acceleration surge. More investigations were made but were unsuccessful in finding any defect until April 2008, when it was discovered that the driver-side trim on a 2004 Toyota Sienna could come loose and prevent the accelerator pedal from returning to its fully closed position. It was later discovered that the floor mats of the affected Toyota vehicles could cause them to accelerate suddenly and that Toyota had known about these problems but had misled consumers and continued to manufacture defective cars. In March 2014, the Department of Justice issued $1.2 billion of financial penalties against Toyota in a deferred prosecution agreement.

In January 2021, engineer Colin O'Flynn was able to induce unintended acceleration with a similar Toyota vehicle using electromagnetic fault injection (EMFI) on a test bench. He used an ECU and components from a wrecked 2005 Toyota Corolla. O'Flynn's experiments were conducted without access to the ECU source code, and without access to the confidential report by the Barr Group.

In late May 2022, Ford issued a recall for the 2021 Ford Mustang Mach-E due to an unintended acceleration issue resulting from the powertrain control module functional safety software potentially failing to detect a software error, resulting in unintended acceleration, unintended deceleration, or a loss of drive power.

== Causes ==
Sudden unintended acceleration incidents are often posited to involve the simultaneous failure of a vehicle's acceleration and brake systems. Acceleration system factors may include:

- Pedal misapplication
- Unresponsive (entrapped) pedals
- Electronic throttle control, throttle position sensor fault or cruise control failure (see drive by wire)
- Stuck throttle (unrelated to pedal position)
- Shorting of tin whiskers
- Diesel engine runaway: Diesel engine power is governed by the amount of fuel supplied. Excessive pressure in the crankcase can force mist of engine oil into the intake manifold, which can be burned in the same fashion as Diesel fuel, thus causing runaway.
- One-pedal driving mode and lack of brake application in deceleration and reverse actions.

Unintended acceleration resulting from pedal misapplication is a driver error wherein the driver presses the accelerator when braking is intended and is unable to quickly realize the mistake. Some shorter drivers' feet may not be long enough to touch the floor and pedals, making them more likely to press the wrong pedal due to a lack of proper spatial or tactile reference. Pedal misapplication may be related to pedal design and placement, as in cases where the brake and accelerator are too close to one another, or the accelerator pedal is too large. The NHTSA estimates that 16,000 accidents per year in the United States occur when drivers intend to apply the brake but mistakenly apply the accelerator.

An unresponsive accelerator pedal may result from incursion. For example, blockage by a foreign object or any other mechanical interference with the pedal's operation, and may involve the accelerator or brake pedal. A design flaw in some Toyota models enabled accelerator pedals to become trapped by floor mats. Throttle butterfly valves may become sluggish in operation or may stick in the closed position. When the driver pushes harder on the right foot, the valve may "pop" open to a point greater than that wanted by the driver, thus creating too much power and a lurch forward. Special solvent sprays are offered by all manufacturers and aftermarket jobbers to solve this very common problem.

Other problems may be implicated in the case of older vehicles equipped with carburetors. Weak, disconnected, or mis-connected throttle return springs, worn shot-pump barrels, chafed bowden cable housings, and cables which jump their tracks in the throttle-body crank can all cause similar acceleration problems.

For drive-by-wire automobiles, a brake-accelerator interlock switch, or "smart throttle", would eliminate or at least curtail any instance of unintended acceleration not a result of pedal misapplication by causing the brake to override the throttle. An unintended acceleration event would require the failure of such a mechanism if it were present. Such a solution would not be applicable to older vehicles lacking a drive-by-wire throttle.

Analyses conducted in the mid to late 1990s on Jeep Cherokee and Grand Cherokee vehicles concluded that hundreds of reported sudden accelerations in these vehicles were likely caused by an undesired current leakage pathway that resulted in actuation of the cruise control servo. When this occurred, typically at shift engage (moving the shift lever from park to reverse), the engine throttle would move to the wide open position. While the brakes were operational, operator response was often not quick enough to prevent an accident. Most of these events occurred in close confines in which rapid operator response would be necessary to prevent striking a person, fixed object, or another vehicle. Many of these events occurred at car washes, and the Jeep Grand Cherokee continues to experience sudden acceleration at car washes across the United States. A statistical analysis of SAIs in 1991 through 1995 Jeeps revealed that the root cause of these incidents could not be human error, as had been historically posited by NHTSA and auto manufacturers.

Physical analysis conducted on Toyota's electronic engine control system including accelerator pedal position sensors (APPSs) in 2011 showed the presence of a significant number of tin whiskers. Tin whiskers are elongated or needle-like structures of pure tin that grow from pure tin and tin alloy surfaces. Toyota's APPS were found to use tin finishes. These tin finishes can produce conductive tin whiskers capable of creating unintended electrical failures such as short circuits. The use of tin finish in Toyota's APPS is therefore a cause for concern. Similarly in 2013, materials used in an automotive engine control unit (ECU) from a 2008 Toyota Tundra truck were analyzed. It was found that pure tin with a nickel underlayer was used as the connector finish in the unit, and analysis revealed tin whiskers on the connector surface. Further testing under a standard temperature-humidity cycling showed tin whisker growth, raising additional reliability and safety concerns. These studies show that poor design choices, such as the use of tin finishes, result in unintended failures.

== Laboratory replication ==
Sudden uncommanded opening of engine throttle in certain models of modern, ECU-controlled automobiles have been replicated multiple times in laboratory settings. A negative surge of voltage (down to 7V) can cause rebooting of the ECU, resulting in the output APS (accelerator position) and TPS (throttle position) reaching 100% while the physical accelerator is still consistently held at 37%. In the study cited, a laparoscopic camera positioned inside the engine confirmed that 100% TPS corresponded with the physical full-opening of the throttle. A review of the logs did not show any abnormalities. A road test with the same conditions resulted in a sudden uncommanded acceleration 4 hours into the study.

== Reported incidents ==
Reported incidents of sudden unintended acceleration include:

- 1987: The 1982–1987 Audi 5000's sales in the United States fell after recalls linked to sudden unintended acceleration. There were 700 accidents and 6 deaths.
- 1988: 1986 Honda Accords were documented to have had sudden acceleration incidents due to the Vehicle Speed Control component, as reported to the NHTSA.
- 1997: Sudden acceleration in Cherokees and Grand Cherokees was reported by Diane Sawyer in a March 1997 ABC News Primetime segment.
- 2000: Several Ford Explorers were reported in the UK where the vehicle was already moving and experienced sudden acceleration.
- 2004: The NHTSA sent Toyota a chart showing that Toyota Camry models with electronic throttle controls had over 400% more "vehicle speed" complaints than those with manual controls.
- 2005: Incident observed in a Toyota Camry. The cause was initially suggested to be a tin whisker, however this was later proven not to be the case.
- 2005: Ida Starr St John had an SUA accident with her Toyota Camry which immediately accelerated without the pedal, and the brake pedal did not stop it.
- 2006: The 2004 model year Ford Mustang Cobra was recalled by Ford for accelerator pedals that failed to return to idle after being fully pressed.
- 2008: Incidents involving the 2005 Kia Amanti and Kia Sephia had been reported that were preceded by a racing or highly revving engine.
- 2009: Toyota Avalon displays unintended acceleration without the floor mat, observed by the dealer.
- 2009: Chase Weir's experience with sudden acceleration in his Ford Explorer while driving on a freeway was widely reported, along with the released 000 emergency recordings.
- 2009–2011: Several vehicle models were recalled in the 2009–2011 Toyota vehicle recalls, which resulted in suspension of production and sales of many of Toyota's most popular models, including the Toyota Prius, Toyota Corolla, Toyota Camry, Toyota Tacoma pickups, Toyota Avalon, Toyota Matrix, and Pontiac Vibe.
- 2016: A complaint was made against the Tesla Model X although the vehicle logs showed that only the accelerator pedal had been pressed by the driver.

=== Audi 5000 ===
During model years 1982–1987, Audi issued a series of recalls of Audi 5000 (the North American name of the Audi 100 at the time) models associated with reported incidents of sudden unintended acceleration linked to six deaths and 700 accidents. At the time, NHTSA was investigating 50 car models from 20 manufacturers for sudden surges of power.

60 Minutes aired a report titled "Out of Control" on November 23, 1986, featuring interviews with six people who had sued Audi after reporting unintended acceleration, including footage of an Audi 5000 ostensibly displaying a surge of acceleration while the brake pedal was depressed. Subsequent investigation revealed that 60 Minutes had not disclosed they had engineered the vehicle's behavior — fitting a canister of compressed air on the passenger-side floor, linked via a hose to a hole drilled into the transmission — the arrangement executed by one of the experts who had testified on behalf of a plaintiff in a then pending lawsuit against Audi's parent company.

Audi contended, prior to findings by outside investigators that the problems were caused by driver error, specifically pedal misapplication. Subsequently, the NHTSA concluded that the majority of unintended acceleration cases, including all the ones that prompted the 60 Minutes report, were caused by driver error such as confusion of pedals. CBS did not acknowledge the test results of involved government agencies, but did acknowledge the similar results of another study.

With the series of recall campaigns, Audi made several modifications; the first adjusted the distance between the brake and accelerator pedal on automatic-transmission models. Later repairs, of 250,000 cars dating back to 1978, added a device requiring the driver to press the brake pedal before shifting out of park. As a byproduct of sudden unintended acceleration, vehicles now include gear stick patterns and brake interlock mechanisms to prevent inadvertent gear selection.

Audi's U.S. sales, which had reached 74,061 in 1985, dropped to 12,283 in 1991 and remained level for three years. — with resale values falling dramatically. Audi subsequently offered increased warranty protection and renamed the affected models — with the 5000 becoming the 100 and 200 in 1989. The company only reached the same level of U.S. sales again by model year 2000.

As of early 2010, a class-action lawsuit filed in 1987 by about 7,500 Audi 5000 owners remains unsettled and is currently contested in county court in Chicago after appeals at the Illinois state and U.S. federal levels. The plaintiffs in this lawsuit charge that on account of the sudden acceleration controversy, Audis had lost resale value.

=== Toyota ===
From 2002 to 2009, many defect petitions were made to the NHTSA regarding unintended acceleration in Toyota and Lexus vehicles, but manyMany? How "many"? of them were determined to be caused by pedal misapplication, and the NHTSA noted that there was no statistical significance showing that Toyota vehicles had more SUA incidents than other manufacturers. Other investigations were closed because the NHTSA found no evidence that a defect existed.

The first major cause of unintended acceleration was found in March 2007, when an engineering analysis showed that unsecured all-weather mats had led to pedal entrapment and drivers accelerating up to 90 mph (140 km/h) with decreased braking power. Early on, Toyota suggested that driver error was to blame, saying that some people may have hit the gas when they meant to hit the brake. This led to Toyota sending a letter to the owners of the affected car, a 2007 Lexus ES 350, asking that they bring their cars in to switch out the all-weather mats. After this recall, Toyota revised the internal design of its cars to ensure that there was 10 mm (0.39 in) "between a fully depressed gas pedal and the floor", but only implemented the new designs upon the next "full model redesign" in 2010. In an attempt to hide these defects from investigators, Toyota switched to verbal communication on the defect rather than traceable forms of communication. As a result, many new cars were knowingly produced with the same floor mat issues that had been identified as being having the potential to cause SUA problems in association with the defective pedal design.

One of those vehicles, a 2009 ES 350, was given as a loaner car to California Highway Patrol officer Mark Saylor on August 28, 2009. Saylor and his wife, daughter, and brother-in-law were driving on State Route 125 in San Diego, California, when their car accelerated out of control and crashed into an embankment, killing everyone in the car. This crash gained nationwide news coverage due to a recorded 911 call from Chris Lastrella, Saylor's brother-in-law. In the moments before the crash, Lastrella told the operator that the accelerator was stuck and that the brakes would not work. The same car had experienced the same problem when Frank Bernard had driven it as a loaner car a few days earlier. Bernard told investigators that he was accelerating to get past a merging truck when the accelerator pedal jammed into the floor mat and remained there when he took his foot off the pedal. Bernard was able to slow the car down to 50–60 mph (80–97 km/h) with the brakes, but was only able to bring the car to a complete stop after putting the car in neutral.

After this incident, Toyota conducted seven recalls related to unintended acceleration from September 2009 to March 2010. These recalls amounted to approximately 10 million vehicles and mostly switched out all-weather mats and carpet covers that had the potential to cause pedal entrapment. At this time, there was little evidence that there was ever any defect in the Electronic Throttle Control System (ETCS) that was installed in Toyota cars after 2002, despite requests to the NHTSA to investigate it, and Toyota announced that the root cause of sudden acceleration had been addressed.

The Department of Transportation reported in 2011 that the only causes for SUA were pedal misapplication and wrong mats. Most complaints came after the Toyota recall. The cars' event data recorders showed application of accelerator pedal and no application of brake pedal. NASA was unable to replicate engine control failure.

A subsequent investigation by Safety Research of the NTHSA/NASA report along with information from Barrs report and Koopmans report stated that bad software design, antiquated ECU hardware fueled by a poor company culture were the likely cause of the SUA in the Toyota Camry incidents.

In April 2013, Betsy Benjaminson, a freelance translator working for Toyota to translate internal documents, released a personal statement about Toyota covering up facts about the sudden unintended acceleration problem. Benjaminson stated she "read many descriptions by executives and managers of how they had hoodwinked regulators, courts, and even congress, by withholding, omitting, or misstating facts". Benjaminson also compared Toyota's press releases and mentioned that they were obviously meant to "maintain public belief in the safety of Toyota's cars—despite providing no evidence to support those reassurances." This public statement was released when Benjaminson named herself as a whistleblower after she had been providing evidence to Iowa Senator Charles Grassley.

This leak of internal documents fueled a criminal investigation by the FBI and the Justice Department that had been ongoing since 2010, and on March 19, 2014, the DOJ issued a deferred prosecution agreement with a $1.2 billion criminal penalty for issuing misleading and deceptive statements to its consumers and federal regulators, as well as hiding another cause of unintended acceleration, the sticky pedal, from the NHTSA. This fine was separate from the $1.2 billion settlement of a class action suit paid to the drivers of Toyota cars who claimed that their cars had lost value as a result of the SUA problems gaining publicity in 2012, and was at the time the largest criminal fine against an automaker in US history. Toyota was also forced to pay a total of $66.2 million in fines to the Department of Transportation for failing to handle recalls properly and $25.5 million to Toyota shareholders whose stock lost value due to recalls. Nearly 400 wrongful-death and personal injury cases were also privately settled by Toyota as a result of unintended acceleration.

=== Mitsubishi Montero Sport ===
In the Philippines, several incidents involving automatic transmission variants of the Mitsubishi Montero Sport (the local name for the Mitsubishi Pajero Sport) were reported since 2015. In spite of an ongoing investigation on the cause of the incidents, Mitsubishi has asserted that the vehicles in question are free of any defects or design flaws. The company however offered a free inspection for Montero owners affected by the incident.

As of April 2019, over 100 complaints against Mitsubishi Motors Philippines were filed by Montero Sport owners. The incident has since been the subject of an investigation by the Department of Trade and Industry (DTI). There are also several sudden unintended acceleration incidents involving 2009 to 2011 Montero that date way back in the year 2010 to 2012. However, no such incidences have surfaced in other countries.

At least 23 SUA incidents involving Montero Sports were recorded by the Philippine National Police Highway Patrol Group, from motorists in Metro Manila, Cavite, Batangas, Iloilo City, Laguna and Tacloban.

=== Tesla ===
As of September 2019, the Tesla Model X, Model S, and Model 3 have had more than 108 sudden unintended acceleration reports, as per NHTSA's Early Warning Page. A petition was issued for further investigation from the NHTSA, claiming Tesla's vehicles may have a structural flaw that can endanger public safety and that the number of sudden unintended acceleration reports filed for the Tesla models was as much as 6000% higher than other brands' cars on similar class or otherwise (pages 63 through 66 on the petition report). The company issued an article in its corporate website blog, claiming "in every case we reviewed them [the customer complaints], the data proved the vehicle functioned properly". In one such case, the company issued a written statement to the effect that the sudden acceleration of up to 112 km/h (70 mph) was due to the accelerator being pressed with no pressing of the brake detected. In January 2021, NHTSA released a statement that it determined the petition's cases were due to driver error and not vehicular failure. In May 2023, State Administration for Market Regulation in China ordered all imported and Chinese-made Tesla to be recalled to include new features that allow switching off regenerative braking and limit the risks associated with one-pedal driving.

Following several high-profile crashes of Tesla vehicles in China, Europe, and the United States, the One-Pedal Driving mode was blamed as one of the factors increasing the risk of SUA crashes, according to Greek crash investigator Costas Lakafossis. In One-pedal driving mode, the driver can accelerate and reverse the car without applying the brakes. The local regulator in China suggested Tesla change the one-pedal driving mode logic and use creep mode as the default behavior. In creep mode, the car moved slowly when not pressing any pedal, forcing the driver to press the brake pedal for any intentional stop. A faulty inverter design could also lead to SUA, according to NHTSA. All Tesla in China were updated to use creep mode as default in May 2023.

On April 17, 2024, the National Highway Traffic Safety Administration (NHTSA) announced that Tesla had recalled all 3,878 Cybertrucks sold as of that date to fix an accelerator pedal pad that could come loose and get lodged in the interior trim, causing the car to unintentionally accelerate.

== Resolution ==
SUA resolutions include applying the brakes or clutch, or shifting into neutral with an automatic transmission. In most cars, fully applied brakes are easily capable of stopping the car while the accelerator pedal is also fully applied. "Pumping the brakes" is strongly discouraged during an unintended acceleration event, as this can lead to a loss of braking power.

Unresponsive (entrapped) pedals can be avoided by using car mat clips.

=== Regulation ===
In China, Ministry of Industry and Information Technology (MIIT) suggested that the one-pedal driving mode contributed to sudden unintended acceleration for the electric vehicles (EV). The government ordered electric car manufacturers to default the vehicle behavior to creep mode, which makes EVs mimic internal combustion engine (ICE) vehicles with automatic transmissions. China also considered adding a safety requirement to the vehicle so that "the braking effect achieved by releasing the accelerator pedal in forward gear (Drive) should not decelerate the vehicle to a stop.", which would effectively ban one-pedal driving. A new standard, GB 21670-2025, prohibited single-pedal mode as the default driving mode for all vehicles, and mandated that brake light must turn on during regenerative braking when deceleration exceeds 1.3 m/s^{2} (4.7 km/h/s; 4.3 ft/s^{2}; 2.9 mph/s).

== See also ==
- Automobile safety defect
- Automotive accident
- Drive by wire
- Electronic stability control
- Santa Monica Farmers Market crash
- Left-foot braking
- Runaway Car, a 1997 TV movie about a car with a stuck gas pedal
