= Gendai Shisō =

Gendai Shisō (現代思想, Contemporary Thought) is a Japanese monthly academic magazine specializing in humanities and social sciences. Published by Seidosha, the journal was first established in 1973. It covers a wide range of fields, including philosophy, cultural criticism, sociology, science studies, feminism, and queer studies.

== History ==
Between the late 1970s and early 1980s, the journal played a pivotal role in introducing French postmodern philosophy to Japan through various special issues. This coverage contributed significantly to the popularity of contemporary French thought in the Japanese intellectual landscape. Notable contributors during this era included Masao Yamaguchi, Shigehiko Hasumi, Kōjin Karatani, Shinichiro Kurimoto, and Akira Asada.

== Editors ==
The journal's founding editor-in-chief was Mikitaka Nakano. Under the leadership of Masashi Miura, who became editor-in-chief in 1975, the journal published numerous translations and introductions of contemporary French philosophy, acting as a driving force behind Japan's "New Academism" boom. Subsequent editors-in-chief included Kimitaka Saito and Yuichi Nishida. Yoshihiko Ikegami headed the editorial department from 1993 to 2010, followed by Kazuki Kurihara until 2019. The current editor-in-chief is Yuichiro Kashida.
