= Higashi-Ikebukuro runaway car crash =

2019 car crash in Tokyo, Japan

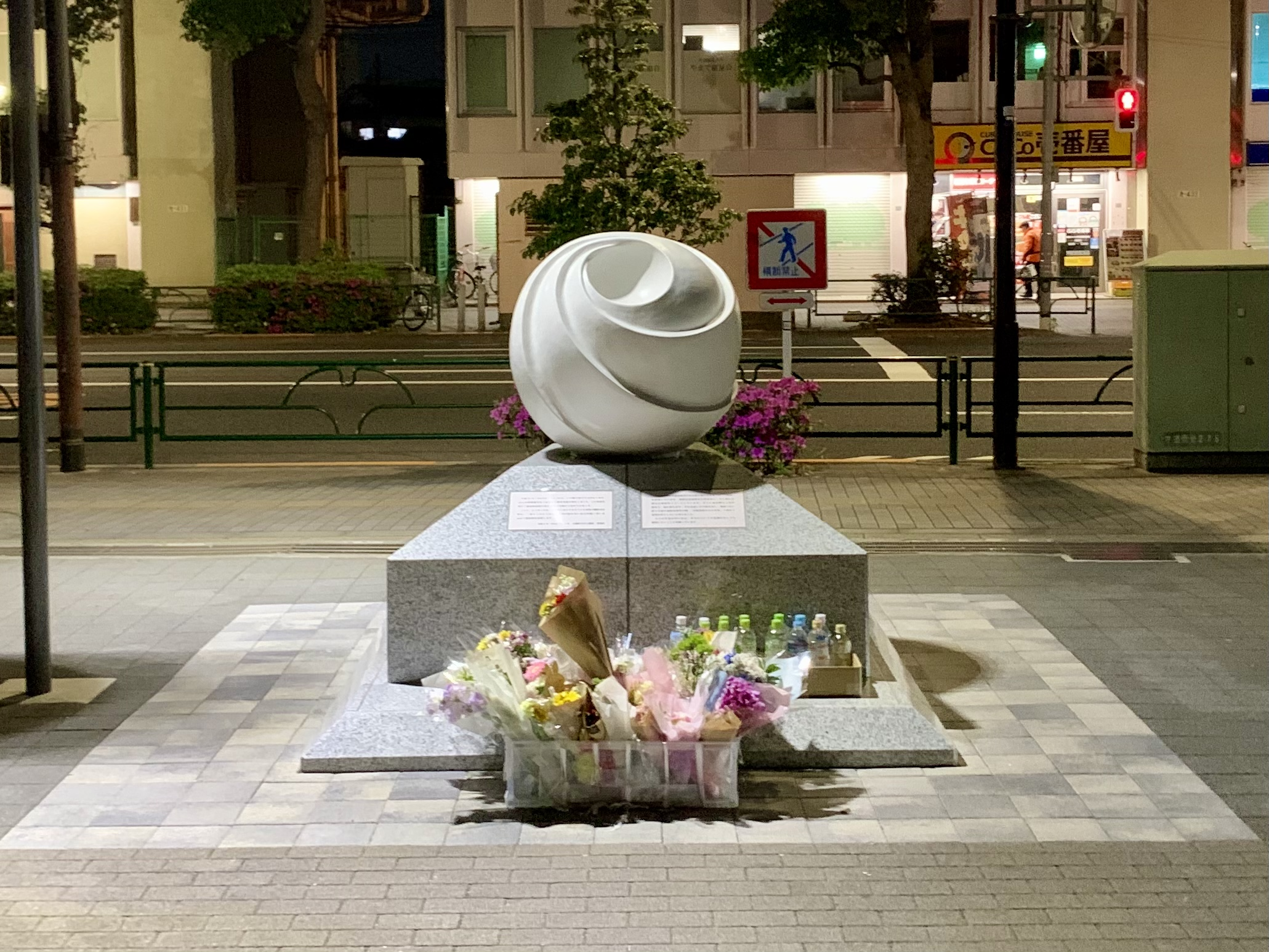
- Memorial of the crash, unveiled July 11, 2020 (Photo taken in 2021)
- Native name: 東池袋自動車暴走死傷事故
- Date: April 19, 2019
- Location: Higashiikebukuro, Toshima, Tokyo, Japan
- Deaths: 2
- Injuries: 10 (Including Iizuka)
- Arrests: 1 (Kozo Iizuka)
- Charges: Dangerous Driving Causing Death or Injury
- Sentence: 5 years without parole

A traffic crash occurred on April 19, 2019, in Higashi Ikebukuro, Toshima, Tokyo, resulting in 2 deaths and 10 injuries. The crash occurred when an 87-year-old passenger car driver mistakenly stepped on the accelerator instead of the brake and entered an intersection hitting pedestrians and bicyclists. In the aftermath of the incident, there was widespread protest throughout Japan at what was seen as special treatment for the perpetrator due to his status as a retired and decorated senior bureaucrat.

== Overview ==
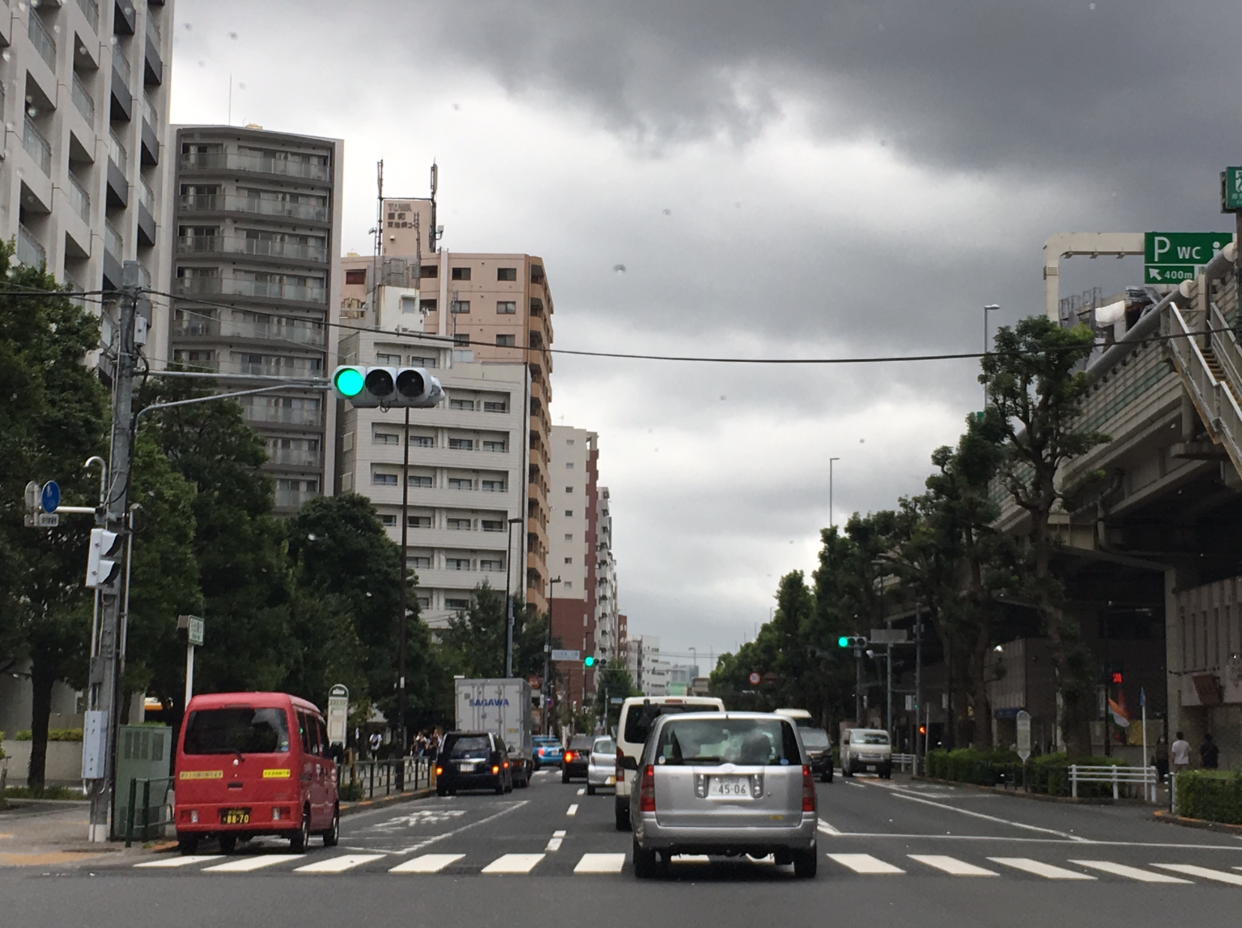
The crash site

At 12:25 p.m., April 19, 2019, Kozo Iizuka, the 87-year-old male driver of a Toyota Prius, and the retired Head of the Industrial Science and Technology Agency of the former Ministry of International Trade and Industry (now the Ministry of Economy, Trade and Industry), caused a traffic crash at an intersection near Tokyo Metro Higashi-Ikebukuro Station in the Higashi Ikebukuro district of Toshima ward, Tokyo.

Iizuka, the driver, ran red traffic lights, and hit several people on a pedestrian crossing, killing two (a mother and daughter) and injuring 10, including the driver himself and his wife, who was in the front passenger seat. The car's data recorder showed no record of him using the brake at any point during the incident. Immediately after the crash, Iizuka telephoned his son, telling him that the accelerator didn't come back up and he had hit people. However, an inspection carried out by the Tokyo Metropolitan Police Department found that nothing had been wrong with the car, and that the airbags had correctly deployed.

It was first reported in the media that there had been eight injuries (including Iizuka and his wife, who was riding with him) and two deaths, but on April 24, the Tokyo Metropolitan Police Department announced that a further two people, another mother and daughter, had received light injuries. This made for a total of 12 injuries or fatalities.

The driver, Iizuka, was already suffering from problems with his legs at the time of the crash, with the cause suspected by his doctors to be Parkinson's disease. Furthermore, when it was discovered that there had been nothing wrong with the accelerator, which Iizuka had blamed the crash for, the Tokyo Metropolitan Police Department determined that the crash had been caused by incorrect operation of the car by Iizuka himself.

Seven months after the crash, on November 12, 2019, the Accident Investigation Bureau of the Tokyo Metropolitan Police Department filed papers with the Tokyo District Public Prosecutors Office charging Iizuka with violation of the Act on Punishment of Acts Inflicting Death or Injury on Others by Driving a Motor Vehicle, etc. Almost three months later, on February 6, 2020, the Tokyo District Public Prosecutors Office indicted Iizuka without arrest.

Hearings for a criminal trial began on 8 October 2020, in which Iizuka continued to deny the charges, claiming that the car had malfunctioned, and saying that he had no memory of accelerating the car. On 4 March 2021, an engineer from the car's manufacturer testified that they found no problems with the car's parts.

At a trial on 15 July 2021, prosecutors sought 7 years imprisonment for Iizuka. In the end, he was sentenced to five years of imprisonment on 2 September 2021.

== Crash ==
The dashcam in the car driven by Iizuka captured the crash and its aftermath on video.

According to the Tokyo District Public Prosecutors Office, in the dashcam recording at the time of the crash, Iizuka's wife shouted "Watch out! What have you done?" as the car entered a leftward curve in the road, with Iizuka then saying "Oh, what's going on?" followed by the car crashing into the curb and metal guard rail at the left side of the road. Footage from nearby security cameras showed that Iizuka then panicked, entering the intersection at a speed of almost 100 km/h (62 mph). The car hit a garbage truck from side on, overturning it, and then plowed into the many cyclists and pedestrians on the pedestrian crossing.

Following the crash, rather than immediately phoning the police, Iizuka phoned his son, telling him that the accelerator wouldn't come back, and that he had hit numerous people.

Iizuka explained that he had gone into the curve at a speed exceeding the 50 km/h (31 mph) speed limit because he was hurrying, afraid that he and his wife would be late for a booking they had made at a French restaurant. He had been weaving amongst traffic, changing lanes three times just before the crash in order to overtake other vehicles.

The car rapidly accelerated after going through the red lights and by the time it fatally hit the mother and child was traveling at a speed of 96 km/h (60 mph).

== Petition, indictment and conviction ==
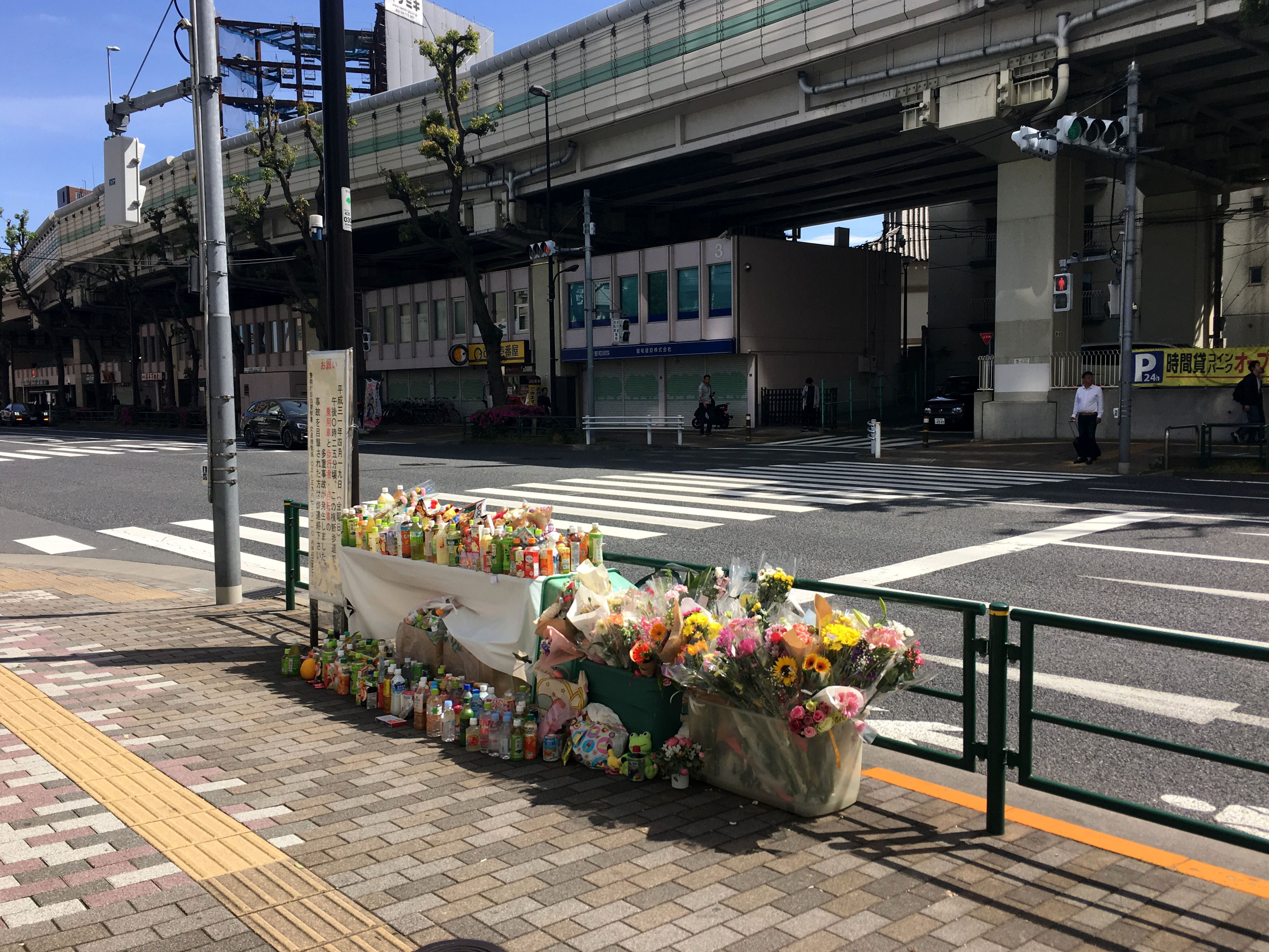
Flower offerings at the scene of the crash

The funeral for the two deceased, Mana Matsunaga, 31 years old, and her daughter Riko, 3 years old, took place on April 24, 2019. On the day of the funeral, the husband and father of the two deceased held a press conference where he announced that he was releasing images of the deceased to the public. He then held another press conference on July 18, 2019, where he announced the launch of a signature-collecting campaign seeking the indictment of Iizuka as the driver who caused their deaths. The campaign began on August 3 in Minami-Ikebukuro Park, where the daughter, Riko, had often played. By the time of its presentation to the Traffic Bureau of the Tokyo District Prosecutor's Office on September 20, 2019, the petition had gathered 391,136 signatures.

Iizuka was subsequently indicted, but not arrested. Iizuka was sentenced to 5 years imprisonment on 2 September 2021 by the Tokyo Regional Court. Neither Iizuka nor the prosecutors appealed the sentence by the deadline of September 17, so the sentence was confirmed. The husband/father of the woman and girl killed by Iizuka, Takuya Matsunaga, commented saying that while it does not feel sufficient given how Iizuka spent the last two years making nonsensical claims, it is the maximum allowed, and that he is thankful to the prosecution for it. Iizuka died of natural causes in prison on October 26, 2024.

== Civil lawsuit ==
In October 2019, Takuya Matsunaga, the husband of the deceased woman and father of the child, brought a civil lawsuit against Iizuka, which proceeded concurrently with the criminal prosecution. Matsunaga announced in January 2021 that civil proceedings had been launched. In October 2023, the Tokyo District Court ruled in Matsunaga's favor, ordering Iizuka to pay ¥140 million in compensation.

== Effects ==
=== Allegations of special treatment ===
Standard police practice in Japan is to arrest suspects of crime at the time they are apprehended; and standard journalistic practice in Japan is to refer to suspects in a case with the noun "suspect" (容疑者, yōgisha) suffixed to their surname, and without the usual honorific suffix of "san" or "sama". However, Iizuka was not arrested at the scene, or anytime thereafter, and was referred to in police reports and in the press as "Iizuka former official" or "Iizuka-san" rather than "Iizuka suspect." This led to criticism that Iizuka was being given special treatment because, being a retired senior bureaucrat, he was considered a "high-class citizen" (上級国民, jōkyū kokumin).

Investigators of the crash said that he was not arrested because he was also an injured party and was admitted to hospital. This meant that his case did not fulfil the requirement for arrest stipulated by the Rules of Criminal Procedure, which is that there be grounds for fearing that he might flee and/or destroy evidence. The investigators claimed that they had not established that he was an ex-bureaucrat until some time after the crash, and that online criticism of them was incorrect.

Regarding the use of honorifics suffixed to Iizuka's name, instead of the usual suffix "suspect", the Asahi Shimbun newspaper explained it saying that it was "to convey that [Iizuka] was a public servant with social influence", and the Nishinippon Shimbun said that it reflected their "clear rule that people not yet arrested should be referred to using an honorific suffix or their work-related title".

It is noted that following referral of the case to prosecutors on 12 November 2019, some media organs began referring to Iizuka as "the suspect, Iizuka" (Iizuka-yōgisha). Professor Yutaka Ōishi of Keio University said regarding the debate over Iizuka's title in the media: "I believe that criticism has been mounting based on the view that has taken hold that the police and the mass media have come together to protect the man [i.e., Iizuka] because he is a former bureaucrat."

The author, Akira Tachibana, commented as follows: "Saying that there is no need to arrest [Iizuka] because he does not satisfy the stipulation that there be grounds for fearing that he might flee and/or destroy evidence is what human rights lawyers have long asserted. Yet, most arrests are made without giving any recognition to this protestation by such lawyers. Thus, in this case, one can only wonder what it was in this case that led to the snap decision to deem arrest unnecessary."

The treatment which Iizuka received gave rise to the popular term "high-class citizen", which was nominated for that year's "'You Can' New Word/Popular Phrase Prize." "High class citizen" was also selected by Shogakukan publishing house as the "Word of the Month" for May for its Daijisen dictionary. Furthermore, "high class citizen" received the third highest number of nominations for the "2019 Prize for New Phrase Selected by Daijisen."

In analyzing the reactions to the incident, Toyo Keizai commentator Atsushi Manabe writes that Iizuka's words and actions after the crash "added fuel to the fire", and as a result the case represents to people how unapologetic liars and coldblooded psychopaths succeed more than regular honest people, which goes against the zeitgeist of the common people. This "victory of brazen shamelessness" represents a loss of morals, and this is why people feel disgust and anger at it.

Manabe also writes that to many people, the case represents how Japanese law no longer functions as it should, with criminals being able to get away with their crimes by using their privileged positions in society.

=== Japanese Wikipedia article controversy ===
Attention was also brought to Iizuka's Japanese Wikipedia article (ja:飯塚幸三), which goes in-depth into his accomplishments, but has no mention of the incident. Editors on the website continuously removed edits regarding the incident, before finally protecting the article so that nobody else could edit it but the administrators of the Japanese Wikipedia. When brought up on the article's talk page, they cited this as being "the result of discussion by the community". Though the topic has been brought up multiple times since, with twelve of the thirteen topics on the talk page as of 8 October 2020 questioning the decision, all such attempts at discussion were answered by the same editors saying that the topic has already been discussed and decided upon by the community.

The problems with the Wikipedia article were widely discussed on social media, and subsequently reported on by the Japanese news media, primarily by smaller web-based media, but also by some major outlets such as The Asahi Shimbun, which questioned the decision of the Wikipedia editors.

Two prominent editors on the Japanese Wikipedia, including Shakespeare specialist Sae Kitamura, explained in an Asahi Shimbun article that the Japanese Wikipedia community takes legal risks arising from potential privacy violations very seriously as a result of there being no local chapter of the Wikimedia Foundation to assist them in lawsuits.

=== Voluntary surrender of driving licence by the elderly ===
The case renewed attention to the problem of crashes being caused by elderly drivers which was a pre-existing topic for several years. It was reported that in the aftermath of the crash, more elderly people voluntarily surrendered their driver licenses. For example, Fuji News Network reported that in the week following the crash, as many as 1,200 people in the Tokyo metropolitan district voluntarily surrendered their licence. Following this, it was reported that, according to the Tokyo Metropolitan Police Department, in the half-year following the crash, 42,252 people voluntarily surrendered their driving licence, which was 80% more people than for the same period in the preceding year. Iizuka's driving licence was revoked by the Tokyo Metropolitan Public Safety Commission in May 2019.

== Memorial ==
A memorial marking the accident is located close to the crash site.
