= Hokkaido Asahikawa Higashi High School =

School in Asahikawa, Japan

Coordinates: 43°46′13.5″N 142°22′7.2″E

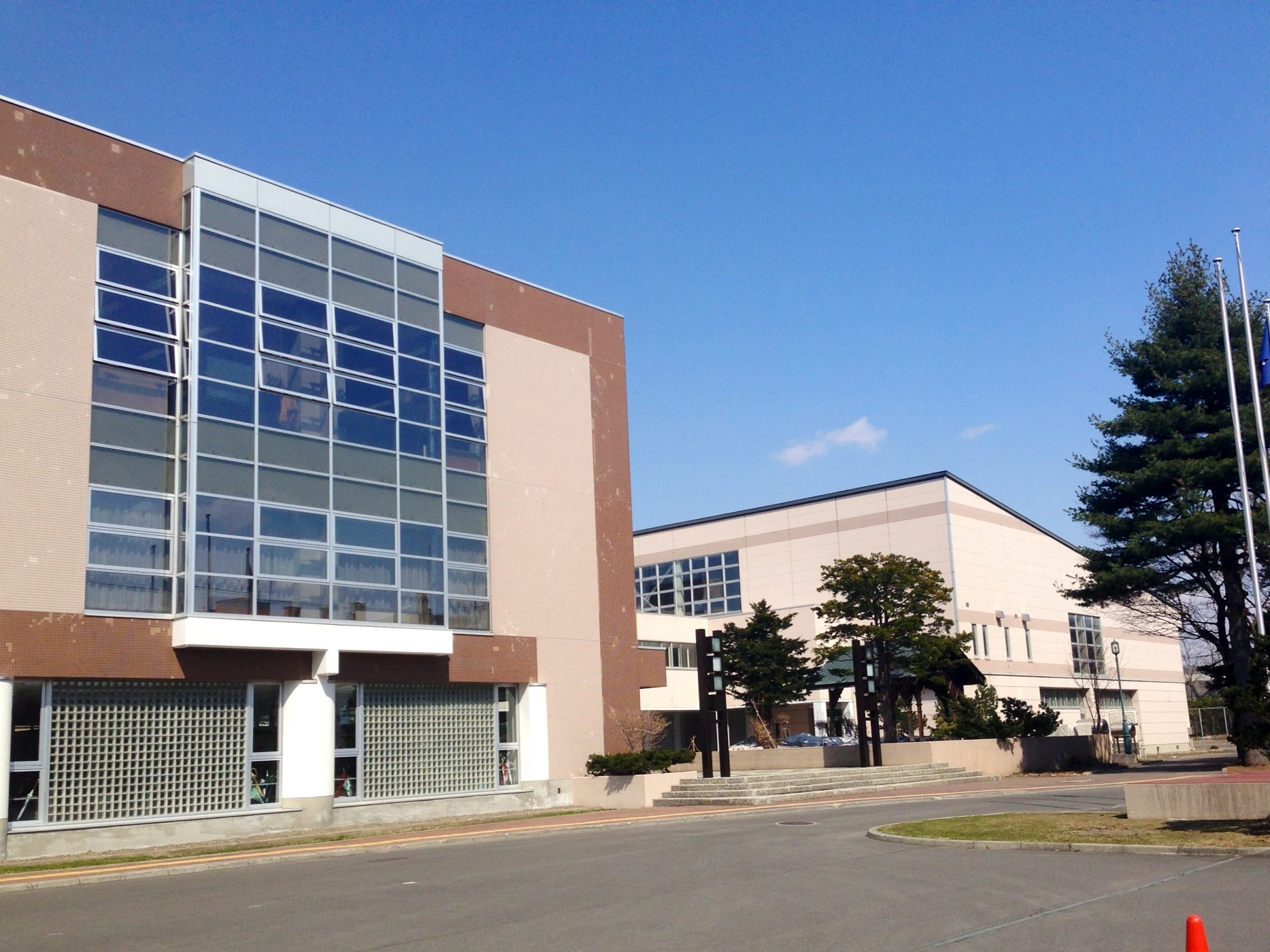
Hokkaido Asahikawa Higashi High School

Hokkaido Asahikawa Higashi High School (北海道旭川東高等学校, Hokkaidō Asahikawa Higashi Kōtō Gakkō) is a high school in Asahikawa, Hokkaidō, Japan, founded in 1903. Hokkaido Asahikawa Higashi High School is one of high schools administrated by Hokkaido.

The school is operated by the Hokkaido Prefectural Board of Education.

== Notable alumni ==
- Buichi Terasawa (寺沢 武一) Manga Artist; representative works: Cobra (manga) 『コブラ』（COBRA THE SPACE PIRATE）, Goku Midnight Eye 『ゴクウ』（MIDNIGHT EYE ゴクウ）, Karasu Tengu Kabuto 鴉天狗カブト
- Kazuhiro Fujita (藤田 和日郎) Manga Artist; representative works: Ushio and Tora 『うしおととら』, Karakuri Circus 『からくりサーカス』
- Noriko Sasaki (佐々木 倫子) Manga Artist; one of representative works: Animal Doctor 『動物のお医者さん』
- Takeshi Aono (青野 武) Voice Actor; representative works: Piccolo (Dragon Ball) 『ピッコロ (ドラゴンボール)』, Dracule Mihawk (One Piece) 『ジュラキュール・ミホーク (ONE PIECE)』, Shiro Sanada (Space Battleship Yamato) 『真田志郎 (宇宙戦艦ヤマト)』, Tomozou Sakura (Chibi Maruko-chan) 『さくら友蔵 (ちびまる子ちゃん)』
- Sou Fujimoto (藤本 壮介) Architect; one of representative works: The 2013 temporary pavilion of Serpentine Galleries, London
- Hiroaki Zakōji (座光寺 公明) Composer and Pianist.; representative works: "Time-Space Continuum", Op. 18 (1982), Chamber Cello Concerto, Op. 29 a (1985), etc.
