= Acquisition of Twitter by Elon Musk =

2022 business acquisition

- Logo before the acquisition

- Logo after the acquisition
- Initiator: Elon Musk
- Target: Twitter, Inc.
- Type: All-cash full acquisition
- Cost: US$44 billion
- Initiated: April 14, 2022
- Completed: October 27, 2022
- Resulting entity: X Corp.

Elon Musk initiated an acquisition of the American social media company Twitter, Inc. (now X Corp.) on April 14, 2022, and concluded it on October 27, 2022. Musk had begun buying shares of the company in January 2022, becoming its largest shareholder by April with a 9.1 percent ownership stake. Twitter invited Musk to join its board of directors, an offer he initially accepted before declining. On April 14, Musk made an unsolicited offer to purchase the company, to which Twitter's board responded with a "poison pill" strategy to resist a hostile takeover before unanimously accepting Musk's buyout offer of $44 billion on April 25. Musk stated that he planned to introduce new features to the platform, make its algorithms open-source, combat spambot accounts, and promote free speech, framing the acquisition as the cornerstone of X, an "everything app".

In July, Musk announced his intention to terminate the agreement, asserting that Twitter had breached their agreement by refusing to crack down on spambot accounts. The company filed a lawsuit against Musk in the Delaware Court of Chancery shortly thereafter, with a trial scheduled for the week of October 17. Weeks before the trial was set to begin, Musk reversed course, announcing that he would move forward with the acquisition. The deal closed on October 28, with Musk immediately becoming Twitter's new owner and CEO. Twitter was taken private and merged into a new parent company named X Corp. Musk promptly fired several top executives, including previous CEO Parag Agrawal. Musk has since proposed several reforms to Twitter and laid off half of the company's workforce. Hundreds of employees then resigned from the company after Musk issued an ultimatum demanding they commit to "extremely hardcore" work. Linda Yaccarino was appointed CEO of X Corp. In July 2023, the Twitter service was rebranded as X.

Reactions to the buyout were mixed, with praise for Musk's planned reforms and vision for the company, particularly his calls for greater free speech, but criticism over fears of a potential rise in misinformation and disinformation, harassment, and hate speech on the platform. Within the United States, conservatives have largely supported the acquisition, while many liberals and former Twitter employees have voiced concerns about Musk's intentions. Since becoming owner, Musk has faced backlash for his handling of the company and account suspensions, including the December 2022 suspensions of ten journalists.

== Prelude ==
=== Background ===
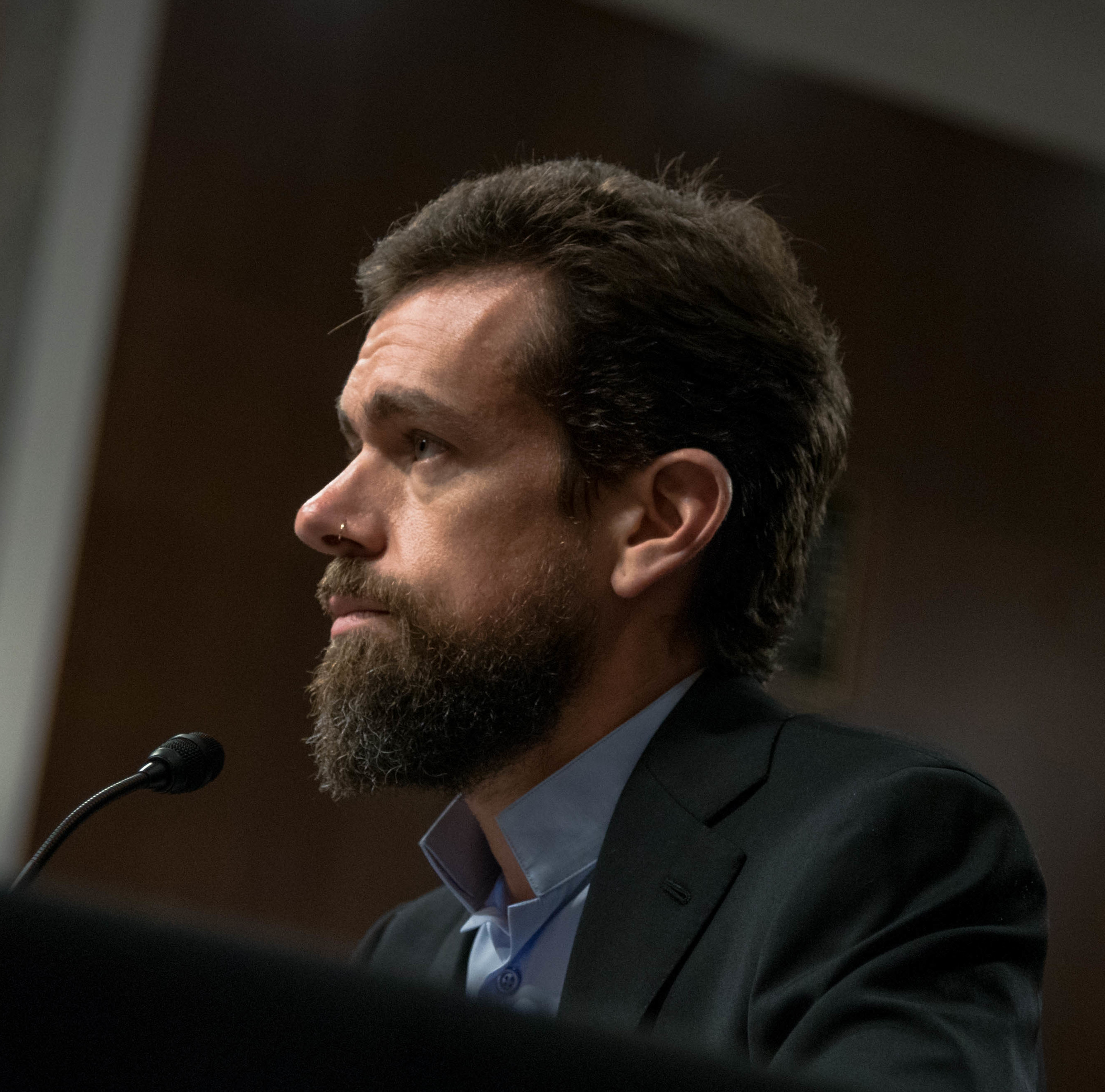
Jack Dorsey, founder

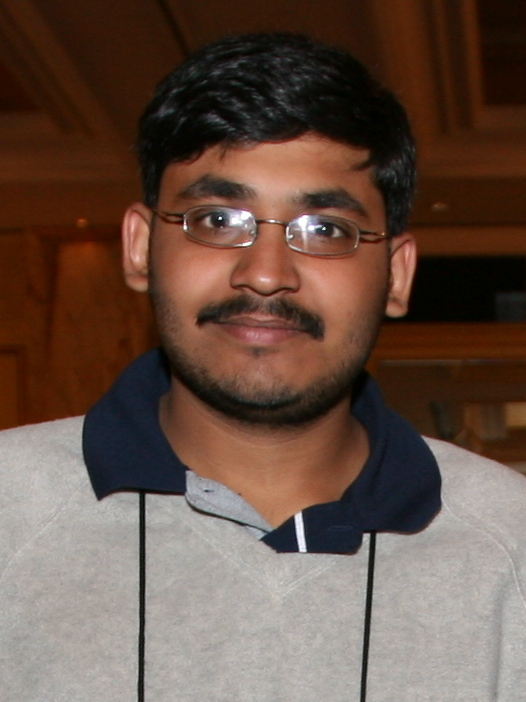
Parag Agrawal, CEO

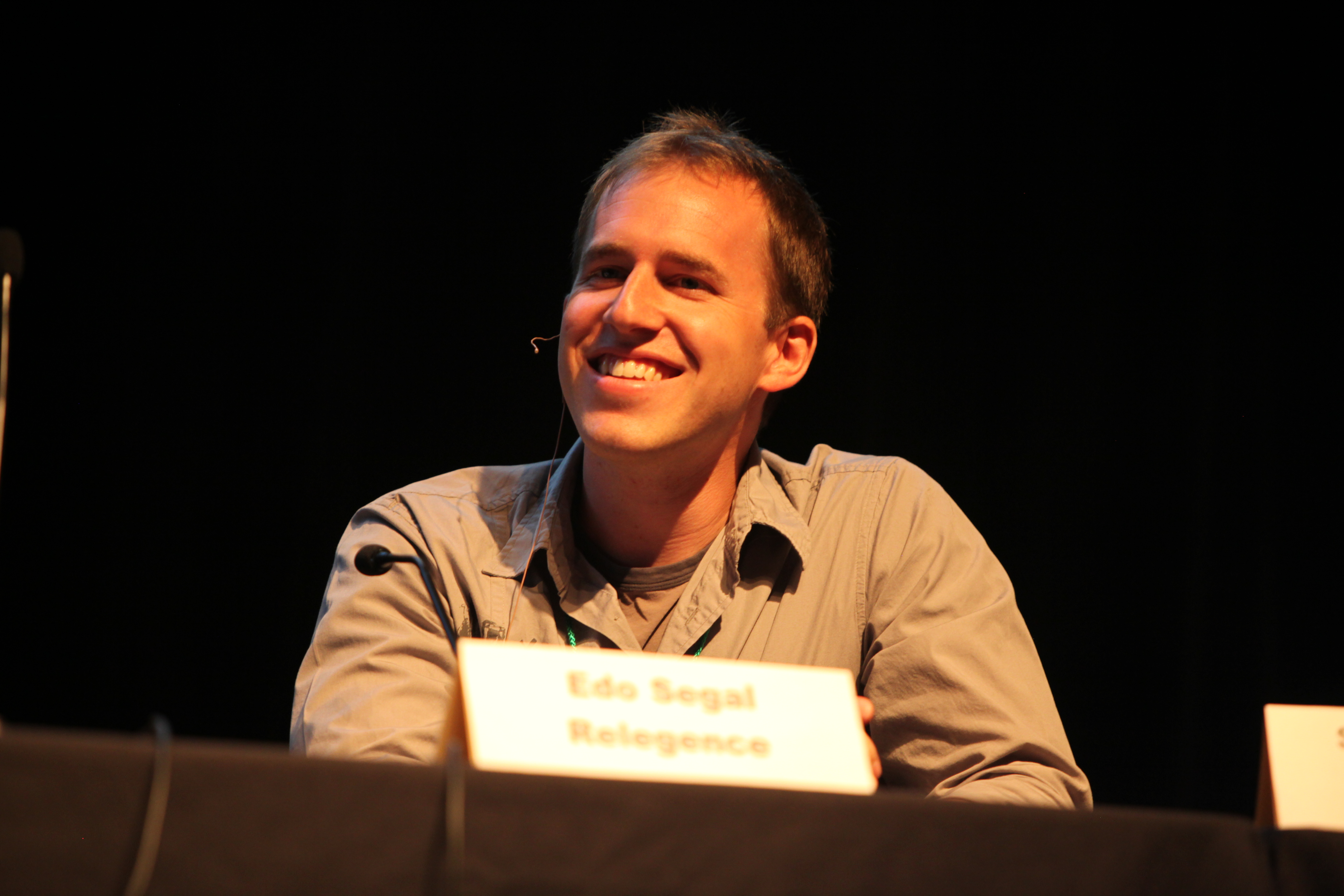
Bret Taylor, board of directors chair

Elon Musk communicated with Dorsey, Agrawal, and Taylor prior to proposing a buyout of Twitter Inc.

Businessman Elon Musk published his first tweet on his personal Twitter account in June 2010, and had more than 80 million followers by April 2022. In 2017, in response to a tweet suggesting that he buy Twitter, Inc., Musk replied, "How much is it?" On March 24, 2022, Musk began tweeting criticisms of Twitter, polling his followers on whether the company adhered to the principle that "free speech is essential to a functioning democracy". Days later, he discussed the future of social media with Twitter co-founder and former CEO Jack Dorsey and explored the possibility of joining Twitter's board of directors with private equity firm Silver Lake co-CEO Egon Durban. He relayed this idea to Twitter board chair Bret Taylor and CEO Parag Agrawal, proposing to either take the company private or start a rival social media platform. Dorsey responded to Musk with a text message, saying he hoped Twitter could become open-sourced and that he had unsuccessfully pushed for Musk's induction into Twitter's board a year earlier, a move that had prompted his departure from his role as CEO.

In September 2022, it was revealed that the CEO of Axel Springer, billionaire Mathias Döpfner urged Musk to buy Twitter through a text message exchange dated March 30, 2022. According to Wall Street Journal, "Before and during Mr. Musk’s breakneck takeover of Twitter, a close-knit group of libertarian-leaning activists and businessmen have been encouraging him to get involved. This group includes the so-called PayPal mafia—former executives at the online payments company who include Mr. Musk, the investor Peter Thiel and entrepreneur David Sacks—as well as ancillary figures like the venture capitalist Steve Jurvetson, an early Tesla investor who once served on the auto maker’s board; and Mr. Musk’s brother, Kimbal, a Tesla board member, according to people familiar with the matter." The WSJ also cited Seth Dillon, the CEO of the Babylon Bee, as a source of influence. The Nation notes the role of the Saudi government, which had close financial ties with not only Musk, but also other Silicon Valley elites such as Thiel, Ben Horowitz and their companies, Palantir and Andreessen Horowitz, as well as TWG Global (later, Palantir, TWG Global and xAI would form a joint venture).

=== Early developments ===
Musk began purchasing Twitter stock on January 31, 2022. On April 4, he announced that he had acquired 9.2 percent of the company's shares totaling $2.64 billion, making him the company's largest shareholder. Following the announcement, Twitter's stock experienced its largest intraday surge since the company's initial public offering (IPO) in 2013, rising by as much as 27 percent. The next day, Twitter invited Musk to join the company's board, which Musk accepted. This had been recommended to the board by Twitter's Nominating and Corporate Governance Committee three days earlier, with some board members expressing concern about potential "adverse impacts on stockholder value". The position would have prohibited Musk from going beyond a 14.9 percent ownership stake and limited his ability to speak publicly about the company. That day, Musk phoned Dorsey, who declined Musk's suggestion for him to remain on the board.

On April 11, after publishing several tweets critical of the company, Musk announced he had decided not to join the board. Instead, he informed Twitter that he intended to make an offer to take the company private. On April 12, Twitter's board met with lawyers and financial advisors to deliberate the ramifications of such a deal as well as their options, while a company shareholder sued Musk for allegedly manipulating the company's stock price and violating Securities and Exchange Commission (SEC) rules.

== Buyout offer ==
=== Takeover bid ===
Avatar of Elon Musk

Elon Musk
(@elonmusk)
tweeted:

I made an offer
https://sec.gov/Archives/edgar...

April 14, 2022

On April 14, 2022, Musk made an unsolicited and non-binding offer to Twitter to purchase the company for $43 billion, or $54.20 per share, and take it private. Though the offer was made to company management, the bid was described as a hostile takeover attempt because of the implied threat to purchase the outstanding stock if management declined. The board responded that it would "carefully review the proposal".

In a TED interview, Musk said he aimed to make Twitter a "platform for free speech around the globe", hailing free speech as a "societal imperative for a functioning democracy" and insisting that he had not made the offer to increase his wealth. Critics noted that he showed more interest in altering Twitter's moderation policies than in fighting government censorship. According to The Washington Post, the banning of accounts such as The Babylon Bee had prompted Musk to initiate the acquisition. The price of $54.20 per share is believed to be a reference to 420, a slang term in cannabis culture for marijuana consumption.

On April 15, Twitter's board of directors announced a "poison pill" strategy which would allow shareholders to purchase additional stock in the event of a hostile takeover; the plan expired on April 14, 2023. On April 17, Taylor was urged by Twitter's largest institutional shareholders to "seriously consider" the offer. On April 20, Musk disclosed that he had secured financing provided by a group of banks led by Morgan Stanley, Bank of America, Barclays, MUFG, Société Générale, Mizuho Bank, and BNP Paribas, for a potential tender offer to acquire the company. The funding included $7 billion of senior secured bank loans; $6 billion in subordinated debt; $6.25 billion in bank loans to Musk personally, secured by $62.5 billion of his Tesla stock; $20 billion in cash equity from Musk, to be provided by sales of Tesla stock and other assets; and $7.1 billion in equity from 19 independent investors.

The initially proposed $13 billion in money borrowed by Twitter was equivalent to seven times the company's 2022 projected operating cash flow; some banks found that multiple too risky and opted to participate only in the $12.5 billion margin loan to Musk. The debt was estimated to cost Twitter approximately $1 billion in annual interest and fees. Two days after announcing his bid, Musk registered three holding companies under the name "X Holdings" in preparation for his takeover. Tesla shares fell 12 percent on the day after the acquisition was announced, amid smaller declines in the broader markets. Musk incurred a $21 billion paper loss that day.

=== Acquisition announcement ===
On April 23, Musk informed Taylor that his offer was "best and final", urging him to accept in a letter sent the following day. He said that Jack accepted the deal and finaled it. Multiple outlets subsequently reported that Twitter was in final negotiations to accept Musk's offer, with a deal expected to be reached by the next day, though Reuters cautioned that the deal could still fall apart. On April 25, Twitter shares rose by 5 percent following reports that Twitter was poised to accept Musk's offer. Twitter advisors Goldman Sachs and JPMorgan Chase approved of the deal, deeming it fair from a financial perspective. Twitter's board publicly and unanimously accepted the buyout offer for $44 billion, and Twitter was to become a private company once the transaction was complete, sometime in 2022. Negotiations with Musk were led by the board's transaction committee, composed of Taylor, Martha Lane Fox, and Patrick Pichette. The deal would require shareholder and regulatory approval before it could be finalized, though analysts believed it was unlikely to be challenged by regulators.

Musk was barred from disparaging the company or its employees when tweeting about the acquisition before the transaction closed. The agreement also stipulated that if Musk failed to close the acquisition, he would be required to pay Twitter a $1 billion breakup fee. Agrawal was set to receive $39 million from the buyout, while Dorsey would receive $978 million. Musk had privately selected a new CEO to replace Agrawal upon completion of the acquisition, though he was expected to serve as interim CEO in the months after its completion. Tesla's stock sank by more than $125 billion the next market day, causing Musk to lose about $30 billion of his net worth. Within three days after Twitter agreed to be acquired, Musk had sold $8.5 billion of his Tesla shares.

After the acceptance was announced, Musk said that his first goal would be to make the algorithm that ranks tweets in the content feed open-sourced, in an effort to increase transparency. He has also stated that he intended to remove spambots and "authenticate all real humans", suggesting that he might convert Twitter's San Francisco headquarters into a homeless shelter. Musk said he lacked confidence in Twitter's corporate management, telling banks that he had considered reducing executive and board pay. He published tweets critical of decisions made by Twitter executives such as Vijaya Gadde, who was subsequently harassed by Twitter users using racist and sexist language. On April 28, Twitter told advertising agencies that their work would not be seen next to offensive material. Musk also discussed with bankers with the ideas of cutting jobs and costs, encouraging influencers to be creative, and adding subscription services to Twitter.

On May 4, the Digital, Culture, Media and Sport Committee of the House of Commons of the United Kingdom summoned Musk to discuss the effect of his buyout on free speech and "online harms". Musk secured another $7.1 billion in funding the next day, including from Oracle Corporation co-founder Larry Ellison, Saudi prince Al Waleed bin Talal Al Saud, venture capital firms Andreessen Horowitz and Sequoia Capital, as well as sovereign wealth fund Qatar Holding. The equity infusion reduced his original $12.5 billion personal bank loan to $6.25 billion and his required cash equity contribution from $21 billion to just under $20 billion. On May 11, The Wall Street Journal reported that the SEC and Federal Trade Commission (FTC) had launched investigations into events leading to the acquisition. The next day, Agrawal fired Twitter general manager Kayvon Beykpour and revenue product lead Bruce Falck.

== Attempted termination ==
=== Alleged hold ===
On May 13, Musk revealed that he had placed the deal "on hold" in the wake of reports that 5 percent of Twitter's daily active users were spam accounts, causing Twitter shares to drop more than 10 percent. Musk clarified that he remained committed to the acquisition, and Agrawal stated he expected the deal to close. In response to a May 16 Twitter thread in which Agrawal said an external review into the platform's users was impractical, Musk tweeted out a poop emoji. The following day, Musk reiterated that the acquisition could not "move forward" until Twitter could prove the aforementioned reports false, urging the SEC to investigate Twitter's daily user numbers. The same day, Twitter filed new documents with the SEC, including a detailed timeline of Musk's purchase, and affirmed they would "enforce the merger agreement" regardless of Musk's actions. On May 25, Musk abandoned plans to partially fund the deal through margin loans against Tesla stock, instead opting to pledge an additional $6.25 billion in equity financing. Dorsey departed Twitter's board the same day, while Twitter investor William Heresniak filed a class-action lawsuit against Musk, alleging that he had violated corporate laws in California by manipulating the market. The lawsuit further declared that Musk was not permitted by the acquisition contract to place the deal on hold, and that Musk's misleading statements had contributed to declining Twitter stock prices.

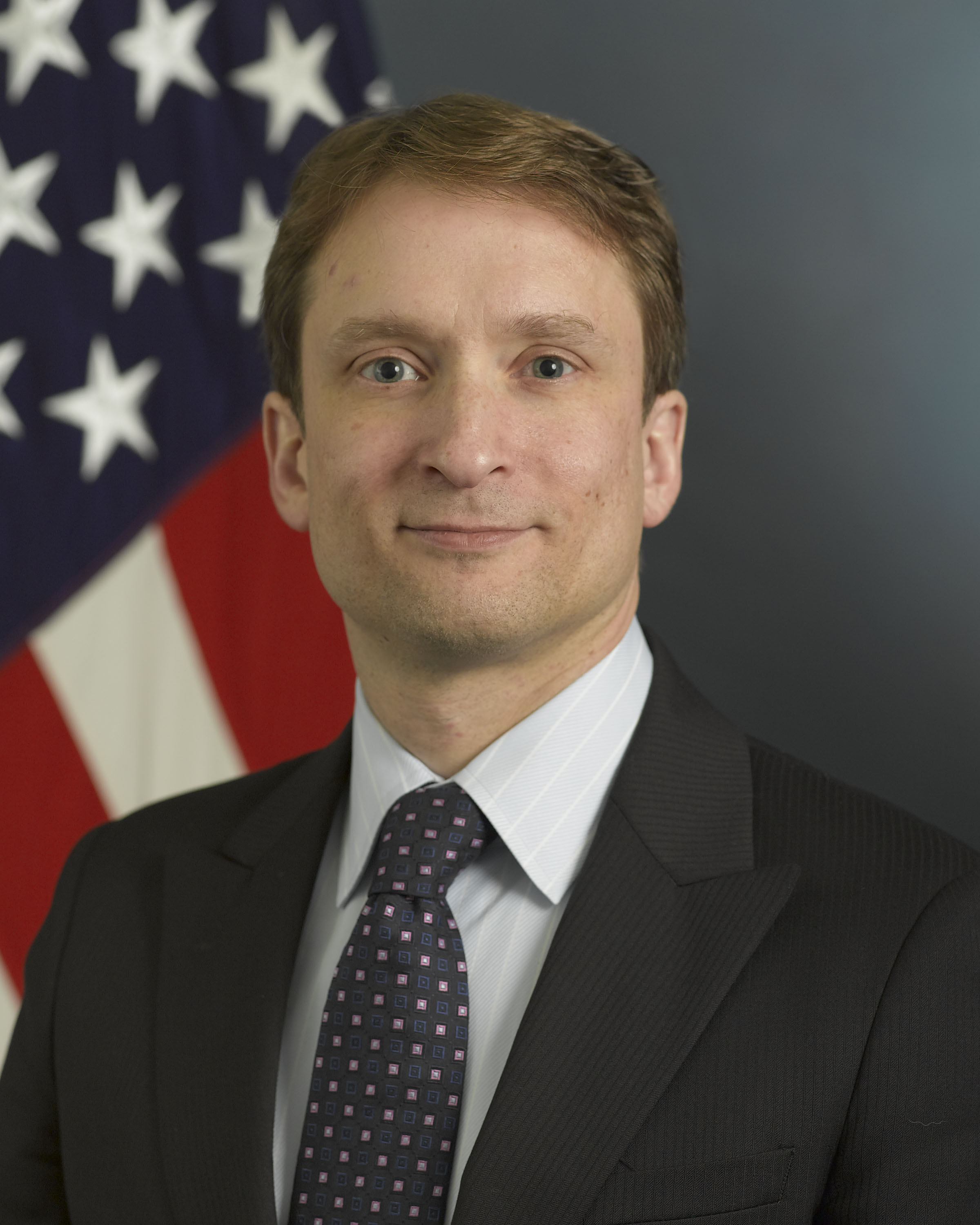
Former Twitter security chief Peiter Zatko claimed that the company had misled the public on its privacy and security woes.

On June 3, the acquisition was cleared by U.S. antitrust review. In an email sent by Musk's attorney to Twitter three days later, Musk threatened to terminate his agreement with Twitter because the company had refused to give him data pertaining to its users. Twitter responded that they would continue to cooperate with Musk to ensure that the transaction was closed in accordance with their agreement. On June 8, Twitter's board complied with Musk's demands, agreeing to provide him with a "firehose" data stream of tweets. A week later, the SEC asked Agrawal to provide information on how Twitter estimated its number of spam accounts, to which the company obliged; the SEC concluded its inquiry on July 27. Musk attended an all-hands meeting on June 16 to answer questions from Twitter employees, discussing Twitter's content moderation policy, freedom of speech, potential layoffs, remote work, and "the cosmic nature of Twitter". Musk also expressed his desire for Twitter to reach one billion active users, and pledged his commitment to advertising as a source of revenue for Twitter.

In a complaint filed by Whistleblower Aid with the SEC, U.S. Justice Department, and FTC on July 6, former Twitter security officer Peiter Zatko accused several Twitter executives, including Agrawal and certain board members, of making false or misleading statements about privacy, security, and content moderation on the platform in violation of the Federal Trade Commission Act of 1914 and SEC disclosure rules. These included misrepresentations to Musk made during the course of the acquisition bid, with the complaint specifically calling Agrawal's May 16 thread deceptive. In a July 7 conference call, Twitter revealed that over one million spam accounts were removed daily, and reiterated that it was impossible to externally determine the exact number of these accounts as it would involve private user data. That same day, The Washington Post reported that the deal was "in peril" amid a slowdown in discussions on funding.

=== Attempted withdrawal by Musk ===
On July 8, Musk announced his intention to terminate the proposed acquisition, claiming in a regulatory filing that Twitter was in "material breach" of several parts of the agreement by refusing to comply with Musk's requests for spambot account data and dismissing high-ranking employees. In response, Taylor pledged to pursue legal action against Musk at the Delaware Court of Chancery with the goal of completing the acquisition, with the ensuing lawsuit once again overseen by the Twitter board's transaction committee. Twitter's stock sank by 7 percent after the news, dropping by a further 11 percent the next day. On July 10, Twitter hired the law firm Wachtell, Lipton, Rosen & Katz to represent its case, including "key lawyers" William Savitt and Leo Strine, along with Potter Anderson & Corroon, Ballard Spahr, Kobre & Kim, and Wilson Sonsini Goodrich & Rosati. Musk again employed the services of Quinn Emanuel Urquhart & Sullivan after previously doing so for Unsworth v. Musk and SEC v. Musk, including his personal lawyer Alex Spiro, as well as Skadden, Arps, Slate, Meagher & Flom.

Twitter formally launched its lawsuit,Twitter, Inc. v. Elon R. Musk, et al against Musk at the Delaware Court of Chancery on July 12, with Musk tweeting in response, "Oh the irony lol". Twitter requested that the trial be held from September 19 through September 22, before the deal's originally scheduled "drop dead" date on October 24. Musk's legal team objected to this, asking for the trial to be held from February 13 through February 22, 2023. On July 19, judge Kathaleen McCormick ruled that the trial would last for five days in October, with Twitter seeking an October 10 start date. During its quarterly earnings investor call on July 22, Twitter cited the "chaos" caused by the proposal as the primary factor for its decline in revenue. In a letter to McCormick on July 26, Musk's lawyers complained that Twitter had hindered them from commencing the discovery process and requested an October 17 start date, which McCormick granted three days later with a duration of five days.

In a tweet on August 6, Musk challenged Agrawal to a public debate on Twitter's spambot accounts, before polling his followers on whether they believed that less than 5 percent of Twitter accounts were "fake/spam". On August 10, Musk sold 7.92 million Tesla shares worth a total of $6.9 billion as backup should he lose the lawsuit, despite previously stating he would no longer sell Tesla stock. The next week, McCormick ordered Twitter to produce documents from Beykpour, which Musk's team had requested along with files from 22 other Twitter employees and 41 "custodians". Shortly thereafter, Musk subpoenaed Dorsey. Other businessmen and investors subpoenaed include Marc Andreessen, Ellison, David Sacks, and Joe Lonsdale, while Twitter and Musk also subpoenaed Goldman Sachs, Morgan Stanley, JPMorgan Chase, Andreessen Horowitz, Sequoia Capital, Salesforce, Mastercard, and more. Sacks and Lonsdale were both irritated that they were being subpoenaed, with the former filing a failed motion to dismiss the subpoena. In total, lawyers for Twitter issued over 84 subpoenas, while Musk's lawyers issued more than 36.

Facing increasing pressure from Musk, Twitter announced that it would combine its health team, tasked with preventing non-consensual nudity and child sexual exploitation on the platform, with its anti-spam team. McCormick rejected much of Musk's team's "absurdly broad" request for data pertaining to all of Twitter's users, but ordered the company to produce data from 9,000 accounts it previously audit sampled. Musk filed a "termination letter" with the SEC on August 29, citing Zatko's claims as evidence Twitter breached their contract, before asking McCormick to delay the trial by a few weeks. McCormick rejected the request, and Musk's team sent a third termination letter to Twitter. On September 13, Zatko testified before the Senate Judiciary Committee, while Twitter shareholders voted in favor of the acquisition. Musk privately offered to purchase Twitter at the reduced prices of $31 billion and $39.6 billion, both of which the company rejected.

== Revival and closing ==
=== Revitalization of bid ===
On October 3, Musk's legal team informed Twitter that Musk had changed his mind and decided to move forward with his proposed acquisition at the originally agreed-upon price of $54.20 per share, on the condition that Twitter drop its lawsuit. The reason for this reversal was attributed to concerns from Musk's team that they would not be able to prove that there was a material adverse effect justifying a break from contract. Musk and Agrawal's depositions were originally scheduled for October 6 and 10, respectively. Musk stated that his purchase of Twitter was part of his ambition to create an "everything app" called X, which would offer many different services. In response, McCormick asked both sides to propose to her how they should proceed. Twitter shares surged by 23 percent as a result of Musk's announcement. Neither Twitter nor Musk responded to McCormick's request, prompting her to announce that the trial would go forward as planned.

On October 6, McCormick agreed to a request by Musk to postpone the trial to October 28 so Musk could finalize his debt financing for the acquisition, adding that the trial would be rescheduled to November if the deal did not close by then. During this time, Musk deposited a $1 billion loan from his company SpaceX, paying back the loan with interest the following month. On October 13, court filings revealed that Musk was being investigated by the U.S. government for his conduct in the proposed buyout. Musk later stated that he believed Twitter's long-term value would exceed the price of $54.20 per share, which he considered an overpayment. On October 20, The Washington Post reported that Musk intended to terminate 75 percent of Twitter's staff, and that Twitter executives were keen on selling the company to Musk so they could mitigate their planned payroll and infrastructure cuts. In an open letter, Twitter employees condemned Musk's intentions and warned of negative consequences on the future of Twitter. Bloomberg News and the Post further reported that officials in the Biden administration were considering a national security review of Musk's proposed acquisition and other ventures via the Committee on Foreign Investment (CFIUS), with the possibility of U.S. President Joe Biden blocking the purchase if need be; the White House denied the reports.

By October 21, both parties' bankers and lawyers were set to complete the paperwork for the acquisition by the end of the month, with the deal expected to close by then. The banks funding the acquisition were to hold the $13 billion worth of debt incurred as opposed to selling it. In a video call with banks who helped Musk fund the acquisition, Musk assured them he would complete the buyout by the deadline. Musk made a trip to Twitter's headquarters on October 26, tweeting a video of him jokingly carrying a kitchen sink at the site's lobby and changing his Twitter bio to "Chief Twit". Musk also told Twitter employees that while layoffs were still likely to happen, he did not intend to do so at the scale the Post had previously reported. The next day, Musk wrote in an open letter to advertisers that Twitter would not become a "free-for-all hellscape", reiterating that his motives for the purchase were not based on greed but rather a desire to create "a common digital town square". He then asked Tesla engineers to meet with Twitter's product managers in order to assess the platform's codebase, which was frozen until November 1.

=== Completion of purchase ===
In the afternoon of October 27, Musk and Twitter closed the deal, with Musk tweeting "the bird is freed". Musk immediately became Twitter's new owner, summarily firing Agrawal, chief financial officer (CFO) Ned Segal, Gadde, and general counsel Sean Edgett, with the executives escorted out of the company's headquarters by security. This move came to the surprise of many involved, who had expected Musk to allow the executives to voluntarily resign; Agrawal had prepared a draft of his resignation letter before his access to his Twitter email account was cut off. According to Walter Isaacson's biography Elon Musk (2023), Musk "meticulously" changed his plans so "he could terminate their employment before their stock options would vest", seeking retribution for Agrawal's handling of the spambot incident.

Agrawal, Segal, and Gadde were set to receive "golden parachute" sums of $38.7 million, $25.4 million, and $12.5 million, respectively, but The New York Times reported that Musk was unlikely to make the payments because the executives had been dismissed for cause. According to the Financial Times, Musk's justification for this assertion was that the company had been mismanaged, and the executives were "weighing their legal options over the decision". Dorsey retained his $1 billion ownership stake, and several other executives departed Twitter in the ensuing days.

Musk assumed the position of CEO, merging the company with X Holdings and dissolving Twitter's board of directors. With this merger, Twitter ceased to be an independent company, with X Corp. later created in March 2023 to house the company. Musk uses the title "Chief Twit" to refer to his position as CEO. A "war room" was established at Twitter, with Musk meeting with Spiro, Sacks, and others to discuss his next steps. According to The New York Times, the group's two primary objectives were to reduce the size of Twitter's workforce and overhaul the platform's mobile app. Twitter employees were not formally informed of the change in management, with Musk originally said to be planning a town hall meeting with employees but ultimately not doing so. The next day, Twitter shares ceased trading in accordance with Musk's pledge to take the company private; the company's stock ticker was delisted from the New York Stock Exchange (NYSE) on November 8.

=== Post-acquisition ===
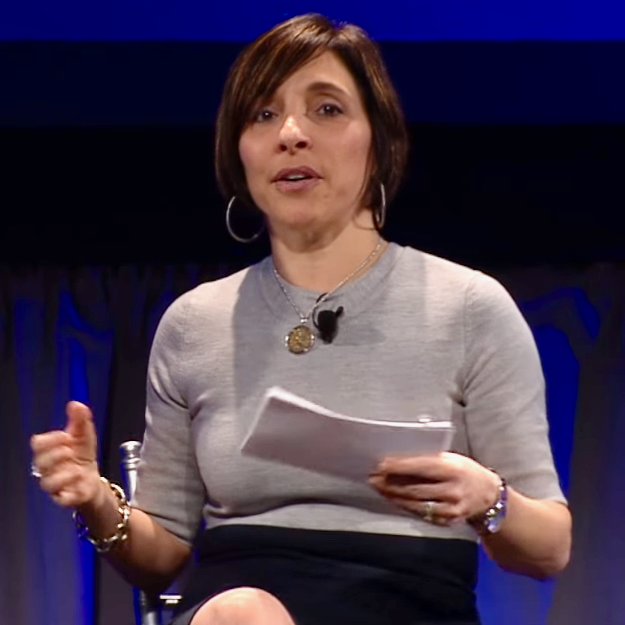
Musk appointed Linda Yaccarino CEO of X Corp., the successor to Twitter.

Since becoming owner, Musk has enacted a series of changes, including overhauling Twitter's verification system by requiring new applicants to purchase a Twitter Blue subscription. Many Twitter staff members were directed to extend their working hours in order to meet Musk's deadlines for his desired changes to the platform. On November 4, Musk laid off roughly half of Twitter's workforce, and two weeks later, he issued an ultimatum to employees to commit to "extremely hardcore" work in order to realize Musk's vision of "Twitter 2.0", or leave. Hundreds of employees resigned in response. From the layoffs and resignations, the company went from close to 7,500 employees to approximately 1,500, a reduction of about 80%.

Meanwhile, Musk began restoring previously banned accounts such as Jordan Peterson, Kathy Griffin, The Babylon Bee, and Donald Trump, while suspending anti-fascist accounts at the urging of far-right figures, as well as accounts that parodied Musk. Musk also relaxed the platform's hate speech policies and removed its policy prohibiting COVID-19 misinformation, resulting in an increase in hate speech. In December, Musk faced backlash after banning ElonJet, a Twitter bot account operated by Jack Sweeney which tracked Musk's private jet in real-time using publicly accessible data. These protests intensified when Musk suspended multiple journalists who had been covering the ElonJet incident. Days later, Musk conducted a Twitter poll asking users whether he should step down as CEO of Twitter, to which voters responded in the affirmative. Musk stated he would step down after selecting his replacement, and he was succeeded by NBCUniversal advertising sales chair Linda Yaccarino in June 2023.

Musk's acquisition of Twitter was principally responsible for the development of Threads, a social media platform which closely resembles Twitter, by rival company Meta Platforms. Work began on the service in November 2022, and it was released on July 5, 2023, amidst continued backlash to changes to Twitter enacted by Musk and Yaccarino. In response, Twitter threatened to sue Meta over intellectual property infringement. Agrawal, Segal, and Gadde filed a lawsuit against Twitter in April 2023, claiming that the company had failed to pay them for the legal fees they had incurred during their tenure. McCormick ruled in the executives' favor in October.

In June, X Corp. sued Wachtell to recoup a portion of the $90 million fee the law firm had paid, accusing the firm of "unjust enrichment" for charging a bonus fee on successful completion of the acquisition when the agreement with prior Twitter management stipulated billing only on an hourly basis. The lawsuit failed. The Twitter app was rebranded as X in July, an unprecedented decision which has created confusion among users. In September, Musk failed to appear before the SEC in response to the agency's investigation into his purchasing of Twitter stock the year prior, prompting a lawsuit. The Wall Street Journal reported in October 2023 that the seven major banks that had provided Musk's acquisition loans failed to follow the standard practice of quickly selling down their exposure to other banks due to a lack of appetite for the debt since Musk took over, instead expected to mark down the debt by at least 15 percent in order to sell it.

The company's financial outlook improved in 2025, partly due to Musk's close relationship with President Donald Trump and the platform's move away from an advertising-only model toward user subscriptions and artificial intelligence, leading to a revival in investor interest and successful refinancing of the remaining debt. By April 2025, banks had sold off the last of the debt related to the company at about 98 cents on the dollar, in what Bloomberg News described as a remarkable turnaround. Earlier in March, Musk announced that xAI, the AI company he founded two years earlier, would acquire X in an all-stock transaction for a total enterprise value of $45 billion, a billion more that what he paid in 2022.

In August 2024, court documents revealed the names of the nearly 100 stakeholders who took part in the October 2022 takeover. Shareholders included including Bill Ackman, Saudi Prince Alwaleed bin Talal, Jack Dorsey, venture capital firms Andreessen Horowitz and Sequoia Capital, (which both had joined a recent $6 billion funding round for Musk’s AI startup xAI). Also named were 8VC (led by Palantir co-founder Joe Lonsdale) and Gigafund (co-founded by PayPal Mafia member Luke Nosek and Stephen Oskoui, both also Founders Fund alumni) — both investors in Musk’s other ventures like The Boring Company — as well as Scott Nolan, a former SpaceX engineer and now partner at Peter Thiel's Founders Fund. Binance, which invested $500 million in Musk's 2022 takeover, and longtime Musk supporter Cathie Wood are also among the names. The filing also includes lesser-known investors like Italian financial firm UnipolSai S.p.A.

== Reactions ==
=== Takeover bid ===
Following Musk's induction to Twitter's board of directors on April 5, Agrawal wrote that he believed Musk's appointment would bring long-term value to the company, while Dorsey wrote that Musk "cares deeply about our world and Twitter's role in it". Dorsey privately relayed his appreciation to Musk for his commitment, texting that he trusted Musk. On April 11, Agrawal stated that he believed Musk's withdrawal from the board was "for the best", noting that the company would "remain open to his input".

Musk's offer to take over Twitter was met with both praise and criticism. On April 14, Twitter employees expressed concern with Musk's views on free speech. Media outlets expressed concerns that his proposed changes to Twitter would result in an increase in disinformation and online harassment. Jim Cramer of CNBC opined that the Twitter board would have "no choice" but to reject Musk's offer due to potential personal liability faced by the board members. On April 19, the National Urban League urged Twitter to turn down Musk's takeover bid, warning of potentially negative consequences on users' civil rights.

Conservative and Republican commentators and politicians in the U.S. who believed Twitter discriminated against right-wing speech expressed enthusiasm for Musk's proposed changes. On April 22, U.S. House Republicans demanded that Twitter's board preserve all records pertaining to Musk's takeover proposal, which sets the stage for a potential congressional probe following the 2022 midterms. Jimmy Patronis, the Chief Financial Officer of Florida, praised Musk's offer and was critical of Twitter's "poison pill" strategy. According to a poll conducted by Harvard University's Center for American Political Studies (CAPS) and the Harris Poll, 57 percent of American voters approved of Musk's purchase of Twitter.

=== Acquisition announcement ===
Agrawal applauded the purchase and assured employees that no layoffs were planned at that time, adding he was proud of Twitter employees "despite the noise" around the company. He also led an all-hands meeting on April 29 to address concerns raised by employees. Dorsey endorsed the sale, saying that "taking [Twitter] back from Wall Street is the correct first step" and that he trusted Musk to be the owner of the company. Former Twitter CEO Dick Costolo denounced Musk's criticism of the company. Gadde allegedly cried during a meeting about the announcement and was subjected to online trolling. Musk's June 17 meeting with employees was generally negatively received by participants, who found Musk's statements "incoherent" and "uninspiring". Musk was repeatedly derided and mocked by Twitter employees on their internal Slack channels after the deal was brokered.

Republican lawmakers in the U.S. Congress such as Jim Jordan, Yvette Herrell, Marsha Blackburn, and Ted Cruz praised the deal, calling it a restoration of free speech. Meanwhile, Democratic lawmakers such as Pramila Jayapal, Jesús García, Marie Newman, Mark Pocan, and Elizabeth Warren criticized Musk and the buyout. In June, Texas attorney general Ken Paxton launched an investigation into whether Twitter had misled authorities on its number of spambot accounts, alluding to prior claims made by Musk. Former U.S. President Donald Trump expressed approval with the deal but stated that he would not rejoin the platform, even if he is unbanned, due to his preference for his own social media platform, Truth Social; Musk later indicated his intention to reverse Twitter's ban on Trump. Mexican President Lopez Obrador stated that he hoped Musk would rid Twitter of "the corruption that's there, manipulation with bots". Federal Communications Commission (FCC) commissioner Brendan Carr responded to calls for the agency to block the purchase by saying that it has no authority to do so, calling such requests "absurd". Thierry Breton, the European Commissioner for Internal Market, emphasized that "any company operating in Europe needs to comply with [their] rules", while the European Union (EU) announced that new online rules would "overhaul" the digital market and Tech Giants.

By April 27, 30,000 new users had joined the decentralized network of servers running open-source Mastodon software. Conservative Twitter accounts experienced a significant increase in followers, while liberal ones experienced a slight decrease; additionally, thousands of left-leaning users deactivated their accounts following the buyout. LGBTQ+ users and activists expressed apprehension about the deal based on tweets by Musk mocking transgender people, fearing that the re-platforming of suspended Twitter accounts would lead to a rise in online harassment and hate speech. On June 3, a group of political advocacy groups which included the Center for Countering Digital Hate, GLAAD, and MediaJustice initiated a campaign to block the proposal by calling for a review of the deal by the government and a boycott of the platform by advertisers.

Henrik Fisker, co-founder of electric vehicle maker Fisker Inc. and a rival of Musk's, left Twitter shortly after the acquisition announcement. Amazon founder Jeff Bezos questioned whether Tesla's business interest in China would give the Chinese government leverage over Twitter via Musk, before answering that it would "probably not". Microsoft co-founder Bill Gates questioned if Musk would allow the spread of public health misinformation, including vaccine misinformation. Wikipedia co-founder Jimmy Wales speculated that Twitter could either thrive or fall within five years under Musk's supervision. Bitcoin investor Roger Ver and Coinbase CEO Brian Armstrong welcomed the buyout, citing the potential for reduction of perceived censorship on Twitter. Google and Alphabet CEO Sundar Pichai said that he hoped Twitter would improve over time due to its importance to society, while Facebook and Meta founder and CEO Mark Zuckerberg expressed confusion and uncertainty over the proposed buyout.

=== Attempted termination ===
Edgett instructed employees not to share commentary on the purported cancellation; nonetheless, several Twitter employees posted humorous messages making light of the situation. Tesla shares rose 2.11 percent in the hours after Musk's announcement. Trump criticized Musk and called the acquisition "rotten", which led to a protracted feud between the two. With the exception of Trump, most conservatives sided with Musk, with former White House chief strategist Steve Bannon attacking Twitter for allegedly lying about the prevalence of its spambot accounts and Turning Point USA CEO Charlie Kirk musing that Musk may have been seeking to "expose" Twitter the whole time. In an email sent to Twitter's employees in response to Zatko's complaint, Agrawal sharply rejected the claims and called them a "false narrative".

=== Completion of purchase ===
Trump responded approvingly of the purchase after the deal was closed, saying that he was pleased Twitter was "in sane hands", rather than what he termed "radical left lunatics". Other Republican politicians, including Dan Crenshaw, Darrell Issa, Marjorie Taylor Greene, Marsha Blackburn, Anthony Sabatini, Amy Kremer, Lauren Boebert, Dick Black, Cruz, and Jordan applauded the purchase as well. Democrat Amy Klobuchar voiced her distrust of Musk and called for tighter government regulation of the platform, while Democrat Chris Murphy advocated for a federal investigation into the role of Saudi Arabia in the purchase. Dmitry Medvedev, deputy chairman of the Security Council of Russia and former President of Russia, was pleased with the news, stating that he hoped Twitter would eliminate "political bias and ideological dictatorship". Breton again emphasized that Twitter was bound by the EU's laws, alluding to the recently passed Digital Services Act.

Internally, Twitter employees expressed concern that Musk would lay off employees before they receive their compensation payments, among other messages criticizing Musk and voicing solidarity with each other. Amid conflicting reports on whether Musk was planning sweeping layoffs, many employees expressed uncertainty and fear on Slack, Discord, and LinkedIn. Women's rights activist Seyi Akiwowo tweeted her disappointment with Gadde's dismissal, while children's rights activist Beeban Kidron said that Musk's newfound power would not result in more free speech. Podcaster Joe Rogan praised Musk for his aspirations, while right-wing Twitter account Libs of TikTok rejoiced over the news of the purchase. Media personality Stew Peters, who had been blocked from Twitter for months, attempted to circumvent the block after the purchase using a new account, which was later suspended. Margarita Simonyan, editor-in-chief of the Russian state-controlled RT broadcasting service, demanded that Musk lift her Twitter suspension. Bin Talal Al Saud congratulated Musk on the purchase, and JPMorgan Chase CEO Jamie Dimon urged Musk to eradicate spambot accounts. Tesla rival General Motors announced it would temporarily stop paid advertising on Twitter. Advertising agencies IPG Mediabrands and Omnicom Media Group recommended their clients temporarily pause advertising on Twitter due to safety and trust concerns over Musk's ownership. A slew of companies proceeded to do so, including Audi, Bentley, the Carlsberg Group, General Mills, Lamborghini, Mondelez International, Porsche, Pfizer, REI, and the Volkswagen Group. Media buying agency GroupM also advised its clients against procuring advertisements from Twitter. Alt-tech social media platform Parler welcomed Musk's purchase, while alt-tech platform Gettr was more skeptical, believing Twitter was "fundamentally broken". Similarities have been drawn between the acquisition and the 2022 film Glass Onion: A Knives Out Mystery, with some viewers comparing Musk to the character of Miles Bron, though director Rian Johnson stated that the similarities were purely coincidental.

Online reception to Musk's completion of the purchase was mixed. According to Memetica, a digital investigations company, several far-right figures experienced a significant increase in followers after the deal was finalized, while many progressives experienced a significant decrease, although it is unclear if Musk's takeover drove the changes in followers. Mastodon once again experienced a surge in sign-ups. Multiple celebrities in the entertainment industry announced their departure from the platform, while some left-wing influencers such as John Pavlovitz and Rob Reiner urged fellow leftists to remain on Twitter for the time being. The Network Contagion Research Institute (NCRI) observed a 500 percent spike in the use of the racial slur "nigger" in the 12 hours after Musk completed the acquisition, while The Washington Post noted an increase in pro-Nazi, misogynistic, and anti-LGBTQ+ tweets. Basketball player LeBron James expressed concern over the NCRI's report, condemning "unfit people saying hate speech is free speech". Twitter responded by saying that the accounts using racial slurs were part of a "trolling campaign" and would be banned summarily. The Center for Countering Digital Hate reported that anti-Black, anti-gay, and anti-transgender slurs had increased since Musk took control of Twitter, while the Anti-Defamation League reported an increase in antisemitic content.

== Critical analysis ==
=== Takeover bid and acquisition announcement ===
Anticipating a takeover, Elizabeth Lopatto of The Verge predicted that it would lead to a mass employee exodus and a possible reinstatement of Trump's Twitter account. After the acquisition announcement, Alex Werpin of The Hollywood Reporter warned of widespread repercussions. Greg Bensinger of The New York Times argued that Musk's acquisition was "about controlling a megaphone" rather than free speech, while Elizabeth Dwoskin of The Washington Post remarked that Musk's free speech vision for Twitter was considered by technologists to be outdated and impractical. Don Pittis of CBC News noted the controversy associated with the wealthy gaining control of media platforms. Brendan O'Neill of Spiked observed that Musk's purchase of Twitter and the resulting backlash represented a "battle for control of the Internet", with Business Insider's Ben Gilbert calling the purchase the latest "battleground" in the culture war between Democrats and Republicans. Michael Hiltzik of The Seattle Times commented that Musk's impact on Twitter would depend on his policies and how he chooses to implement them. Paul R. La Monica of CNN Business suggested that Tesla's declining stock price indicated that Wall Street investors were doubtful on whether Musk's purchase would go through. CleanTechnica's Matt Pressman believed that Musk's purchase would benefit Tesla because owners of the company's cars often engaged on the platform, and Lindsey Bakes of Deseret News wrote that Musk could integrate cryptocurrency within Twitter.

Kevin D. Williamson of American conservative magazine National Review likened Musk's purchase of Twitter to the Donald Trump 2016 presidential campaign, labeling it a publicity stunt, his colleague Rich Lowry said that liberal politicians' strong reaction to Musk's purchase was an indication that Twitter's existing policies had "political consequences", and the editors of the publication wished Musk well in his quest to promote free speech on Twitter. Bonnie Kristian of evangelical magazine Christianity Today felt that the purchase would only "add to the confusion" surrounding the contentious debate on free speech, while Paris Marx of American socialist magazine Jacobin dismissed Musk's proclamations that he sought to protect free speech as an "example of his hubris". Corbin K. Barthold of conservative public policy magazine City Journal believed it would be difficult but "worth the struggle" to end censorship on Twitter, while Peter van Buren of The Spectator World opined that Musk should simply take Twitter offline. Cathy Young of center-right news website The Bulwark felt that Musk's planned reforms to Twitter were "unlikely to succeed", further observing that commentators who opposed the purchase viewed it as right-wing backlash against "perceived left-wing social media bias". Robby Soave of American libertarian magazine Reason postulated that Musk's purchase would not threaten Twitter or democracy, suggesting that those overstating the importance of the platform were "Musk's critics in progressive and mainstream media", with James McElroy of The American Conservative further arguing that many journalists' condemnation of the acquisition was motivated by "professional anxiety".

Equity analyst Angelo Zino believed that Twitter's acceptance of Musk's proposal may have stemmed from its realization that alternative bidders would be unlikely to emerge due to social media companies' declining asset prices. Associate professor Brian Quinn of Boston College Law School noted that it would be difficult for Musk to arbitrarily pull out of the deal due to the contractual doctrines of fair dealing and good faith. Kate Klonick, a law professor at St. John's University, argued that to allow "all free speech" to exist on Twitter would open the door to the spread of pornography and hate speech. Similarly, Joan Donovan, research director at Harvard's Shorenstein Center on Media, Politics and Public Policy, stated that the lack of moderation on Twitter would lead to online harassment. Bill George, a senior fellow at Harvard Business School and former CEO of Medtronic, argued that Musk's purchase of Twitter would harm both society and Musk himself, while analyst Mike Proulx of Forrester Research cautioned that other companies may leave Twitter if Musk loosens its moderation policies. Proprietary trader Dennis Dick opined that Musk's spambot claims were tactics by him to lower the price of the purchase. Analysts noted that the involvement of foreign entities as independent investors could cause the transaction to face national security scrutiny by the CFIUS. Left-leaning media watchdog Media Matters for America and think tank Australian Strategic Policy Institute suggested that China could use its influence to extract political concessions or manipulate Twitter due to Musk's ties to the country. American Civil Liberties Union (ACLU) executive director Anthony D. Romero warned of the potential danger of Musk wielding excessive power.

=== Attempted termination ===
Following Musk's announcement that he intended to terminate the agreement, legal experts generally agreed it would be difficult for him to do so. Law professor James Park of the University of California, Los Angeles found Musk's spambot argument weak and doubted it was material, while Case Western Reserve University business law professor Anat Alon-Beck observed that Twitter was compelled to enforce the merger so as to disprove Musk's allegations. Professor Jennifer Grygiel of Syracuse University mused that Musk may reverse course and revisit the deal. Tulane University Law School associate dean for faculty research Ann Lipton and mergers and acquisitions expert Julian Klymochko both expressed doubts that Musk could prove there was a material adverse effect.

Felix Salmon of Axios noted that a clause in the contract opened the door for a judge to grant specific performance and order Musk to move forward with the deal. CNBC's Jonathan Vanian described Musk's withdrawal as the product of months of buyer's remorse, while his colleague Alex Sherman observed that paying the stipulated breakup fee would not relieve Musk of compensations or sanctions. Writing for The Wall Street Journal, Holman W. Jenkins Jr. questioned whether Musk had proposed the acquisition "out of mouth momentum or excessive enjoyment of the limelight or for some mysterious reason that causes an onlooker to throw up his hands". Various news publications believed that Zatko's complaint provided potential evidence in Musk's favor, though Bloomberg News columnist Matt Levine argued that the complaint confirmed Twitter's monetizable daily active users counts do not include spambots.

=== Revitalization of bid ===
Greg Varallo of the Bernstein Litowitz Berger & Grossmann law firm observed that if Musk failed to secure funding and close the acquisition, he could be barred from claiming that he can terminate the acquisition as per the legal doctrine of judicial estoppel. New York University's Center for Social Media and Politics executive director Zeve Sanderson cautioned that if Musk were to lay off 75 percent of Twitter's workforce, it would make it more difficult for the company to moderate its content. Professor David Kaye of the University of California, Irvine School of Law and Professor Eric Goldman of the Santa Clara University School of Law concurred, warning of a potential increase in misinformation and harassment on the platform. However, they noted that the layoffs could still be mitigated through an increase in automated content moderation.

=== Completion of purchase ===
Conservative commentators celebrated the purchase's closure. Fox News host Tucker Carlson argued that Musk's laissez-faire approach to moderation on Twitter would reshape American political discourse. Shapiro wrote that he hoped other social media platforms would implement Musk's proposals and called on Musk to reverse Peterson's suspension from Twitter. Political commentator Matt Walsh saw the purchase as an opportunity to rally opposition against the "trans agenda". Political columnist Benny Johnson called on Musk to reverse the suspensions of several prominent conservatives. Spiked's O'Neill claimed that liberals' negative reaction to the closure reflected their fear of freedom and liberty, while Washington Examiner's Christopher Tremoglie disapproved of Musk's idea for a moderation council as continued censorship.

Lauren Hirsch of The New York Times observed that Musk would face financial challenges in owning Twitter, including the company's difficulty in turning a profit. Richard Waters of the Financial Times echoed Hirsch's sentiments, adding that it would difficult for Musk to allow the right amount of free speech on the platform. Kate Ferguson of Deutsche Welle viewed Musk as unreliable and therefore unfit to operate Twitter, and Hamilton Nolan of The Guardian felt the purchase was an attempt by Musk to "control the conversation". Barbara Ortutay, Tom Krisher and Matt O'Brien of the Associated Press noted Musk's contradictory and vague messages in the past regarding his vision for Twitter, while Ben Burgis of Jacobin criticized liberals' technocratic views and their downplaying of the importance of free speech in response to the purchase, though he remarked that Musk had a history of suppressing his critics. Also writing for The New York Times, Kate Conger, Ryan Mac, and Tiffany Hsu noted that Musk's meetings with civil rights activists and his plans for a content moderation council were reminiscent of the actions taken by Zuckerberg following backlash on Facebook's handling of the 2016 U.S. elections. Politico's Jack Shafer noted that media coverage of Musk's purchase foretold "chaos, greater political oversight, and outright failure."

Edward Niedermeyer, an author and critic of Musk, argued that Twitter may fail due to Musk's hubris. Scholars who studied the First Amendment, such as professor Jonathan Turley of the George Washington University Law School, praised Musk's plans to tone down content moderation on Twitter. New York University's Center for Business and Human Rights deputy director Paul M. Barrett speculated that a moderation council under Musk would face skepticism due to Musk's "erratic and imperious" behavior in the past. Alex Stamos of Stanford University's Center for International Security and Cooperation questioned how Musk would respond to foreign governments attempting to influence Twitter's userbase. Those in the cryptocurrency field, such as podcaster Bryce Paul and investor Cathie Wood, expressed excitement at the prospects of Musk's ownership.

Media Matters for America president Angela Carusone warned that Musk's leadership would lead to an increase in disinformation, conspiracy theories, and harassment on Twitter. Literary group PEN America opined that the midterm elections in November would serve as a test as to whether Musk would allow disinformation to spread rapidly on the platform, while American left-wing activist coalition Stop the Deal warned of real-world consequences if a rise in hate speech occurs on Twitter. Over 40 civil rights groups signed an open letter to 20 Twitter advertisers urging them to abandon the platform if Musk lifts its content moderation measures. Anti-Defamation League CEO Jonathan Greenblatt said he was "cautiously optimistic" about the purchase, but expressed concerns over a potential rise in hate speech. Fight for the Future director Evan Greer appreciated Musk's idea for a moderation council, but noted that Musk had supreme authority on any decisions made. Eliot Higgins of Bellingcat believed that Musk's attempts to promote free speech would backfire under increased government regulation. LGBTQ+ advocacy group Human Rights Campaign voiced concern at Twitter's new ownership and argued that Twitter has the responsibility to stop its platform from turning into a "dangerous media environment". The Guardian has also suspended submissions to X due to a number of far-right conspiracy theories and posts promoting racism.

== Legacy ==
On the first anniversary of the acquisition, Musk valued the company at $19 billion, a 55 percent decrease from the buyout's $44 billion purchase price. Fidelity, which contributed $300 million to the acquisition, depressed the value by 65 percent. Statistics indicated a 30 percent decline in active users, 60 percent decline in advertising, 14 percent decline in website traffic, and 38 percent decline in app downloads. The company has denied this, claiming an increase in engagement. A nonfiction book about the acquisition, Breaking Twitter: Elon Musk and the Most Controversial Corporate Takeover in History, was announced by author Ben Mezrich in December 2022 and released in November 2023.

Many publications reflected on Twitter's first year under Musk's ownership. Journalists for The Washington Post, citing data from the University of Washington, wrote that the platform had "become a cacophony of misinformation and confusing reports", remarking on Twitter's stark shift toward conservatism. Pranav Dixit of The Guardian lambasted the changes and reforms Musk had instituted in the past year, while Miles Klee of Rolling Stone criticized Musk's alleged pandering to "right-wing extremists and peddlers of misinformation". The Verge's Jay Peters pointed to Musk's radical changes and declining user numbers as evidence that the takeover was a "disaster", while Bloomberg's Aisha Counts zeroed in on the increase in misinformation and hate speech. Kate Conger of The New York Times and Alex Kirshner of Slate lamented that Musk's acquisition had fundamentally changed the meaning of Twitter. Annika Burgess of the Australian Broadcasting Corporation declared, "Twitter as the world knew it is dead". Musk has largely dismissed this negative commentary.

The Wall Street Journal opined in 2024 that the $13 billion Musk had borrowed to buy Twitter was "the worst merger-finance deal for banks" since the 2008 financial crisis, adding that the "allure" of banking Musk had proved "too attractive to pass up". The Washington Post reported that the company had lost $24 billion in equity value, "a vaporization of wealth that has little parallel outside the realm of economic or industry-specific crashes, or devastating corporate scandals."

=== Class action lawsuit and outcome ===
A class action suit was filed against Musk just before he bought Twitter. On March 20, 2026, the San Francisco, California jury found Musk liable for misleading investors, though they absolved him of some fraud allegations, finding he did not "scheme" to defraud investors. Specifically, Musk was found to have misled shareholders in two tweets, but not in a podcast, as the views he expressed in that were an opinion. Damages have yet to be calculated, but plaintiffs' lawyers estimated them to be $2.5 billion.
