= Steve Berman (lawyer) =

American lawyer

Steve W. Berman
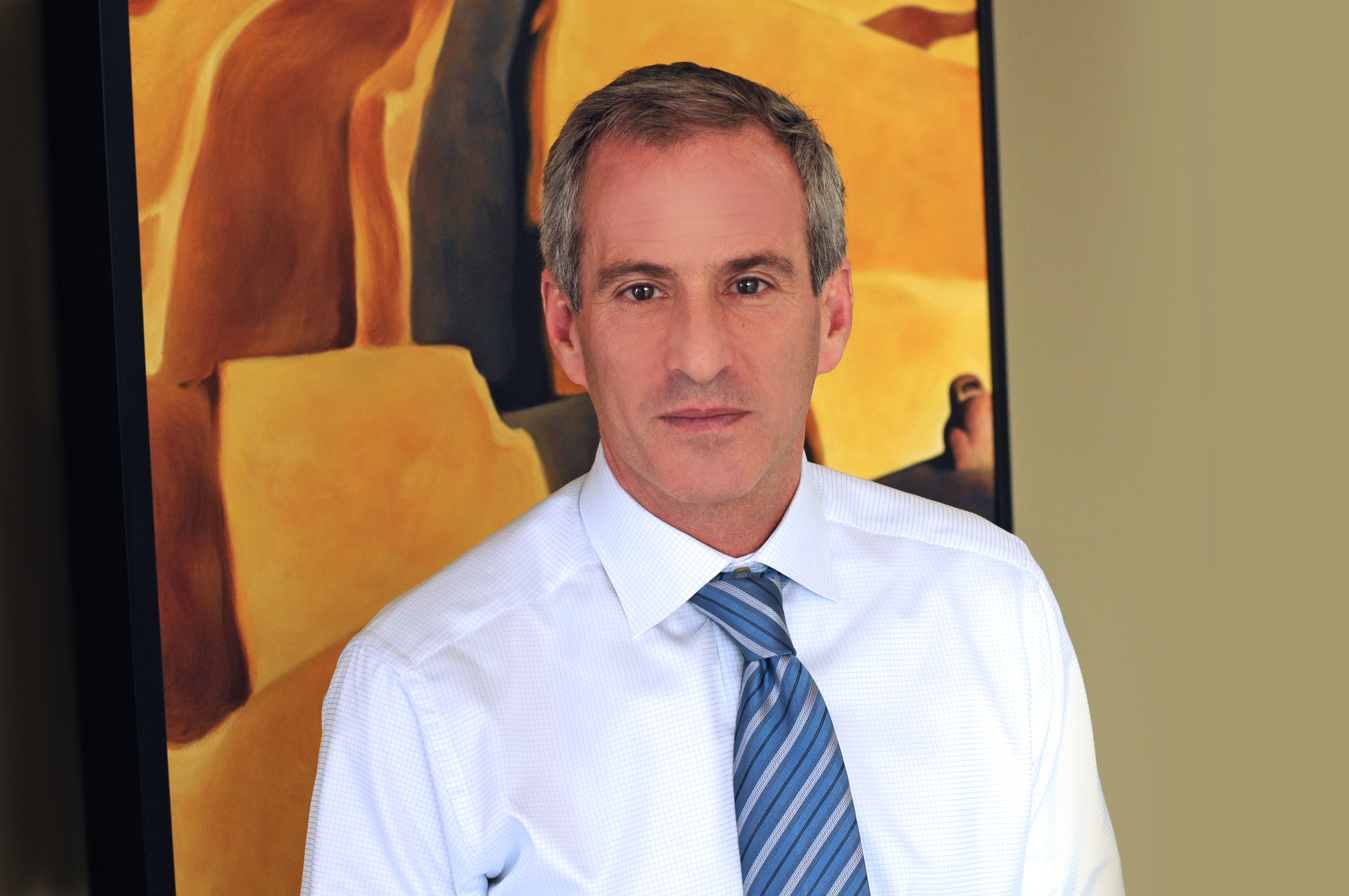
- Education: University of Michigan, Bachelor of Arts, 1976; University of Chicago Law School, Juris Doctor, 1980
- Occupation: Attorney
- Employer: Hagens Berman
- Title: Managing partner
- Website: www.hbsslaw.com

Steve W. Berman is an American plaintiff's lawyer who founded and is managing partner of Hagens Berman, a law firm based in Seattle, Washington.

== Early life and education ==
Steve Berman was born in 1955 in Chicago, Illinois and was raised mostly in Highland Park, Illinois. His father ran an insurance company that sold policies for security guards and police officers. Berman was drafted into U.S. military during the Vietnam War in 1972, but the war ended before Berman could be deployed. Berman completed his undergraduate degree at the University of Michigan in 1976. He earned his J.D. degree from the University of Chicago Law School in 1980.

== Career ==
=== Early career ===
After graduating from law school, Berman worked for Jenner & Block, then Shidler McBroom Gates & Lucas, which later became K&L Gates. He represented plaintiffs in some of the first sexual harassment lawsuits in Washington. His interest in class-action lawsuits began in 1989, after winning an $850 million settlement for investors that provided bonds for a failed nuclear power plant project. He then worked for Bernstein Litowitz Berger & Grossmann, who acted as co-counsel on the lawsuit, and later for Betts Patterson & Mines. At the time, he focused on shareholder lawsuits representing shareholders against large companies.

=== Hagens Berman and tobacco lawsuits ===
In 1993, Berman's employer decided not to take on a case against Jack in the Box for allegedly exaggerating to investors regarding the quality of the company's food before an e-coli outbreak. The law firm was worried taking the case would harm its relationships with insurance companies they helped defend. In response, Berman left and started his own firm, Hagens Berman Sobol Shapiro LLP, with four partners and a few associates, so they could pursue the Jack in the Box case. The case settled two years later for $12 million. By 2014, Hagens Berman Sobol Shapiro LLP had 80 employees and 9 offices.

The law firm continued to use class-action lawsuits to target "social ills or corporate malfeasance." Berman became known for his work in the 1990s against tobacco companies. At the time, most people believed tobacco companies could not be held liable for health problems associated with their products. After six years of litigation, where Berman represented 14 of 46 U.S. states that participated, the case was settled in 1996 for $206 billion. Washington CEO Magazine estimated Berman would receive a total of $100 million in compensation, while an article in the Irish Times estimated Berman's share was $10 million per year for 25 years.

The firm suffered a setback in 2006 when it was ordered to pay $10.8 million to three small water-bottling companies in Maine. Hagens Berman had originally represented the bottlers in a lawsuit about water quality. But when the companies wanted to accept an out-of-court settlement offer, the law firm decided to instead pursue class action lawsuits over the objection of the bottlers. A jury found that the firm had been disloyal to its original clients.

=== Later work ===
Berman has continued to pursue class-action lawsuits against corporations. His firm won a $215 million settlement from Enron related to lost employee pensions after the Enron scandal and $1.6 billion from Volkswagen related to the Volkswagen emissions scandal on behalf of car owners. Berman won $1.63 billion from Toyota related to sudden unintended acceleration in certain Toyota vehicles. Berman also sued the National Collegiate Athletic Association for their response to athlete concussions and for allegedly violating antitrust laws by prohibiting athletes from receiving compensation. Berman has also sued pharmaceutical companies for alleged price-fixing, SeaWorld for its treatment of orcas, and Butterfinger for its alleged use of child labor.

In the late 2010s, Berman started lawsuits against oil companies, accusing them of causing climate change, on behalf of coastal towns and others affected by rising water levels. The lawsuits used similar reasoning as the tobacco lawsuits in the 1990s, alleging oil companies willfully misled the public about the environmental harms of their product.

Among Berman's most prominent recent matters has been litigation challenging the compensation rules of the National Collegiate Athletic Association (NCAA). As co-lead counsel representing current and former Division I student-athletes, he helped negotiate the landmark House settlement, which received final court approval in 2025. The agreement provides approximately $2.78 billion in back-pay damages to athletes while establishing a revenue-sharing framework valued at more than $20 billion over the following decade. The settlement is widely regarded as the largest antitrust settlement in U.S. history and fundamentally changed the economic model of collegiate athletics by expanding opportunities for athletes to receive compensation for the commercial use of their name, image, and likeness (NIL).

Berman has also led antitrust cases involving Amazon. In De Coster v. Amazon, he serves as co-lead counsel in litigation alleging that Amazon's marketplace policies artificially increased prices paid by consumers. In 2025, the U.S. District Court certified a nationwide class estimated to include approximately 288 million consumers, making it one of the largest consumer antitrust classes ever certified in the United States. In a separate action, Frame-Wilson v. Amazon, Berman represents consumers alleging that Amazon's pricing policies unlawfully increased prices charged by competing online retailers. The litigation remains ongoing following the denial of Amazon's motion to dismiss.

His technology-related litigation has further expanded to actions against Apple. Berman has represented plaintiffs in antitrust litigation challenging Apple's iCloud storage policies, alleging that restrictions within the iOS ecosystem unlawfully limited competition in cloud-storage services. He has also served as counsel in litigation involving Apple Pay, in which payment card issuers allege that Apple monopolized the mobile wallet market on iOS devices through restrictive business practices.

Berman has also pursued antitrust litigation involving the real estate industry. As co-lead counsel in nationwide litigation challenging commission practices among major real estate brokerage franchises, he helped secure settlements exceeding $1 billion, including a final approval of a $42 million settlement and additional agreements reached with other defendants. The litigation has contributed to significant changes in residential real estate commission practices in the United States.

Another area of his recent practice concerns competition within the financial services industry. As co-lead counsel in litigation against Visa, Mastercard, and several large financial institutions, Berman represented ATM operators alleging that network agreements unlawfully prevented competition over ATM access fees. The litigation resulted in court-approved settlements totaling more than $264 million.

In agricultural antitrust litigation, Berman has represented consumers and workers in lawsuits alleging price-fixing and wage suppression across the meat-processing industry. These cases have involved beef, pork, broiler chicken, turkey, frozen potato products, and poultry-processing labor markets. Collectively, settlements approved in these matters have exceeded $700 million, including one of the largest antitrust wage-fixing recoveries in U.S. history on behalf of poultry processing employees. Several related actions remain pending against additional defendants.

Berman has also continued to pursue litigation involving industrial products and municipal procurement. In 2024, Hagens Berman initiated an antitrust action alleging that major firetruck manufacturers conspired to restrict production and inflate prices paid by municipalities. Filed without a preceding government investigation, the lawsuit marked one of the first nationwide antitrust challenges addressing alleged price-fixing within the North American fire apparatus industry.

In addition to antitrust matters, Berman has remained active in automotive defect and emissions litigation. He has represented vehicle owners in cases involving alleged emissions cheating, safety defects, and product failures involving major automobile manufacturers. Litigation led by Hagens Berman has produced settlements exceeding $21 billion while contributing to changes in vehicle safety practices, emissions compliance, and consumer protections within the automotive industry.

== Personal life ==
Berman is married and has three children. He is a triathlete and cyclist.
