= Linda Yaccarino =

American business executive (born 1963)

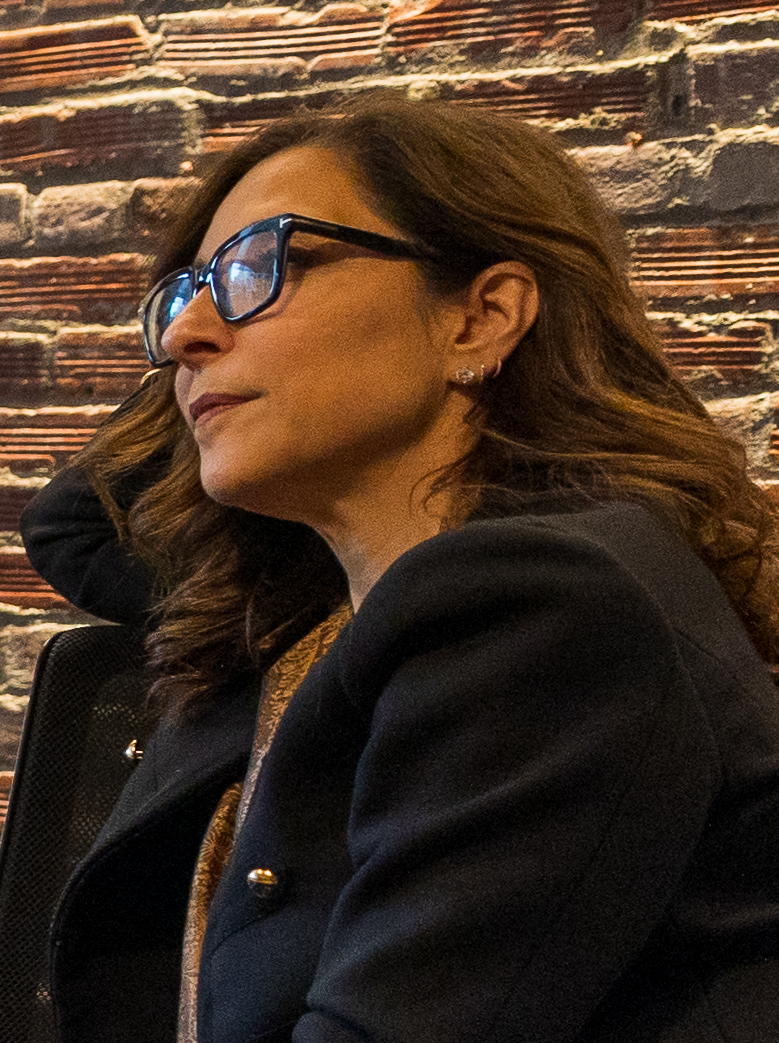
- Yaccarino in 2024
- Born: December 21, 1963 (age 62); Long Island, New York, U.S.
- Education: Pennsylvania State University (BA)
- Occupation: Business executive
- Known for: Former CEO of X Corp.
- Title: CEO of eMed
- Spouse: Claude Madrazo
- Children: 2

Linda Yaccarino (born December 21, 1963) is an American business executive. She was chief executive officer (CEO) of X Corp from 2023 to 2025 and chairman of global advertising and partnerships at NBCUniversal from 2011 to 2023. Since 2025, she has been the CEO of eMed, a telehealth company.

== Early life and education ==
Yaccarino grew up in Deer Park, New York, where her father was an assistant chief of police, and her mother was a civil servant. Yaccarino has two sisters; one is her twin. She graduated from Pennsylvania State University's College of Communications with a bachelor's degree in telecommunications in 1985.

== Career ==
=== Advertising sales executive ===
Yaccarino worked at Turner Entertainment for 15 years, becoming executive vice president and chief operating officer. She is credited with modernizing the company's ad sales strategies. At Turner, she negotiated ad deals on the reboot of Conan O'Brien's late night comedy show.

Yaccarino joined NBCUniversal in October 2011, hired by then-CEO Steve Burke. As the head of NBCUniversal's advertising sales, she led a department of over 2,000 people, and played a key role in the launch of the Peacock streaming service. When Burke began planning stepping down as CEO, Yaccarino had made a bid to be his successor, but she was not picked. Though praised by advertisers and acknowledged as a hardworking saleswoman, associates from her time at NBCUniversal said her tenure was "marked by instability," with multiple reorganizations creating a decline in the culture of the department.

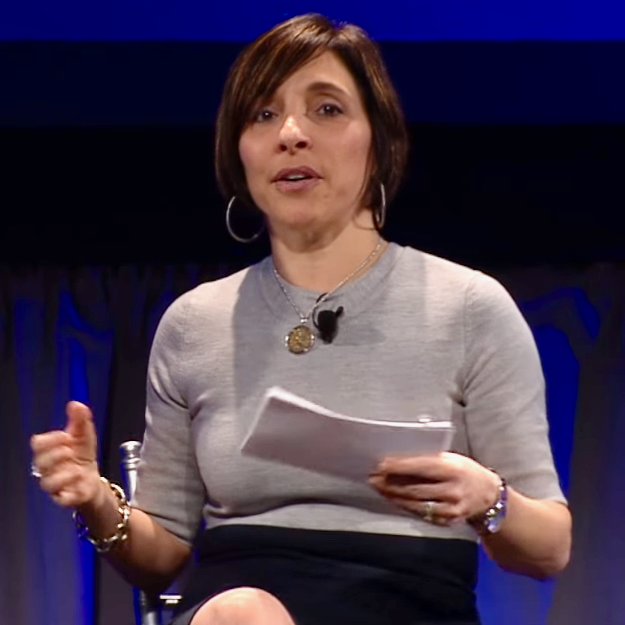
Yaccarino in 2014

Yaccarino joined the Ad Council in 2014. Yaccarino assumed the position of chair of the Ad Council's board of directors in January 2021, for a term that ran until June 30, 2022. As chair, Yaccarino partnered with the Biden administration in 2021 to create a COVID-19 vaccination campaign that featured Pope Francis.

In 2018, President Donald Trump appointed her to the President's Council on Sports, Fitness, and Nutrition.

While at NBCUniversal, advertising discussions with Netflix led to Netflix suggesting she take a job running its ad sales, but it did not go far and inspired her to take a career change, according to two of her former colleagues.

=== Twitter/X ===
==== Early interest ====
Yaccarino had long expressed an interest in Twitter, and she had been a part of the company's "Influence Council", which had advertisers advise the company on brand deals. On three occasions while at NBCUniversal, Yaccarino proposed that Comcast executives buy Twitter, Inc. outright. Early conversations around a potential $3 billion offer never resulted in a deal. Following Elon Musk's acquisition, Yaccarino pledged to him that NBCUniversal would continue advertising on Twitter, according to people familiar with conversations.

Super Bowl ad space negotiations for NBCUniversal to run ads on Twitter were occurring in early 2023 between Yaccarino and Musk, which led to more frequent communications between the two. She invited him to speak at an ad event in April of that year.

==== Chief executive officer ====
Yaccarino resigned from NBCUniversal on May 12, 2023, and on the same day, Musk announced that Yaccarino would be the new chief executive officer of Twitter's owner X Corp. Yaccarino had been preparing for an upfronts presentation, and had not informed any colleagues of her departure. She took over as CEO of X Corp. on June 6. On July 23, Twitter was rebranded as X.

Fortune and The New Republic described Yaccarino as a former Trump appointee who follows a number of conspiracy theorist and far-right accounts on Twitter. Upon her appointment, the Financial Times noted that Yaccarino's previous work with the World Economic Forum (WEF) had earned backlash from some "more conspiracy-minded Musk fans" who distrusted international political organizations. Musk, a harsh critic of the WEF, stated that Yaccarino's links to the organization would not harm his self-proclaimed commitment to free speech on Twitter.

Upon her appointment, experts were concerned Yaccarino's role would be an example of the glass cliff. Yaccarino has said the implication that she had not earned her role saddened her, stating, "I literally went to the business world not even knowing being a woman was a thing."

Yaccarino was ranked 58th on Fortune's list of Most Powerful Women in 2023, noting that she had the connections needed to repair X's relationships, but questioned if Musk still "pulled the strings." Fortune also listed Yaccarino as one of the CEOs who struggled the most in 2023, writing that she "seems either unable or unwilling to restrain her boss from his worst impulses while failing to reassure advertisers that all is under control."

In June 2024, the Financial Times reported "growing tensions between Musk and Yaccarino", as Musk "pile[s] pressure on her to raise revenues and lower her expenses".

On July 9, 2025, Yaccarino announced her resignation from X Corp. She did not give a reason for her departure. One day before, X's generative AI chatbot Grok received a hastily removed update which saw the chatbot used to make racist and antisemitic statements – including praising Adolf Hitler and endorsing a second Holocaust – as well as sexually violent fantasies about various people, including Yaccarino herself.

===== Advertising suspensions and related lawsuits =====
Under Musk's and Yaccarino's leadership, hate speech has increased on the platform, which has caused companies to suspend advertising. The Center for Countering Digital Hate (CCDH) privately warned Yaccarino in June 2023 about rising hate speech and the financing of hateful people. After being ignored, the CCDH published its research showing the rise of hate speech and misinformation; Yaccarino suggested to Musk that Twitter sue, which it did that July. In November, after Musk made comments in support of an antisemitic conspiracy theory, a number of companies, including Yaccarino's former employer, Comcast, paused their advertising with X. Yaccarino attributed the pause in advertising to a Media Matters for America report that claimed ads on X from major corporations had appeared next to white nationalist and Nazi content, rather than to Musk's comments; in a company-wide email, Yaccarino said the article was "misleading and manipulated." Amid the controversy, Yaccarino was privately urged to resign by a number of advertising executives, including friends.

Yaccarino publicly supported X's lawsuit against Media Matters, posting on X, "You know I'm committed to truth and fairness. Here's the truth. Not a single authentic user on X saw IBM's, Comcast's, or Oracle's ads next to the content in Media Matters' article." At a company meeting, when asked what she would like the outcome of the lawsuit to be, Yaccarino replied, "the validation that Media Matters, unfortunately, manipulates, in this case, not just advertisers, but people in general."

In August 2024, Yaccarino announced that X had filed an antitrust lawsuit against the Global Alliance for Responsible Media (GARM), founded in 2019, with the stated aim to ensure that advertisers' brands weren't "associated with harmful content," for orchestrating an 'illegal' advertisement boycott against X. Days after the lawsuit was filed, GARM announced it discontinued its activities because the lawsuit has "significantly drained its resources and finances."

===== Children's online safety =====
In November 2023, Yaccarino was subpoenaed by a U.S. Senate panel to testify at a hearing on children's online safety. At the hearing, Yaccarino endorsed Senator Dick Durbin's STOP CSAM Act, a bill to allow victims of child sexual abuse material to sue tech platforms for facilitation.

=== eMed ===
In August 2025, Yaccarino was appointed CEO of Miami-based telehealth company, eMed.

== Personal life ==
Yaccarino and her husband, Claude Madrazo, met shortly after she graduated in 1985. They have two children, one who worked at X, and one grandchild. They live in Sea Cliff, New York. She is Roman Catholic.
