= SEC investigation into the acquisition of Twitter by Elon Musk =

Investigation into Elon Musk's stock disclosures of Twitter

Since May 2022, the Securities and Exchange Commission (SEC) has been investigating Elon Musk and his purchase of Twitter. At issue is Musk's late disclosure of his 9.2% position in Twitter on April 4, 2022, 21 days after he was legally required to do so. In addition, the SEC is also investigating why Musk filed a 13G form for passive investors rather than a 13D form for activist investors, and whether or not tweets Musk made regarding his takeover offer for Twitter should have been disclosed as material changes.

Over the course of the investigation, despite a subpoena being issued, Musk repeatedly delayed his testimony, leading to a failed bid for sanctions against him. The incident culminated in a lawsuit by the SEC against Musk in January 2025.

== Background ==
Under Sections 13(d) and 13(d)(1) of the Securities Exchange Act, which was passed in 1934, investors are required to report beneficial ownership of an equity security like stocks once they acquire more than 5% of that class of securities. Once investors surpass this 5% threshold, they have 10 days to file a Schedule 13D form that details information about their acquisition.

By January 31, 2022, Elon Musk began buying purchasing Twitter stock and disclosed a 9.2% stake in the company on April 4, amounting to $2.64 billion, making him Twitter's largest shareholder. He crossed the 5% 13D threshold on March 14, 2022, 21 days prior to his disclosure. Over the following days, Musk would engage in talks with Twitter CEO Parag Agrawal to join the company's board and to take the company private in a $44 billion buyout. Musk would continue to purchase Twitter stock during this period heading into May 2022, upon which he was sued by Twitter shareholders accusing him of engaging in market manipulation and purchasing stock at artificially low prices. The suit, which alleged numerous SEC violations, was prompted by the agency's decision to make public an ongoing investigation into the matter on May 12.

== Investigation ==
The investigation primarily focuses on Musk's late disclosure of his Twitter stock and why he chose to file a Schedule 13G form, which is typically reserved for passive investors, rather than a 13D form for activist investors.

=== Musk testimony ===
In 2022, after supplying the SEC with documents and testifying twice for two half-day sessions in July via videoconferencing, the agency sought to have Musk sit down for additional testimony. Under an investigative subpoena, he was initially set to appear for testimony in San Francisco on September 15, 2023, but failed to appear, with his lawyer Alex Spiro stating that "enough was enough". On September 26, Musk informed the agency that he would be unable to appear for testimony in any location, prompting the SEC in October to obtain a court order compelling him to testify.

The complaint was heard by Magistrate Judge Laurel Beeler in the United States District Court for the Northern District of California. Seeking to dodge another sit-down, Musk claimed that it was too "burdensome" for him to testify. He further argued that the SEC lacked the authority to subpoena him because it was not "issued by an officer appointed by the President, a court, or the head of a department." Beeler rejected Musk's arguments in December, requesting that he and the SEC settle on a deposition date by February. Because they were unable to come to a common consensus, on February 12, 2024, Beeler ordered Musk to testify in San Francisco. Following the ruling, Musk immediately sought a district court review of the order. District Judge Jacqueline Scott Corley, who presided over the review, signaled a willingness to uphold Beeler's ruling on May 9, and issued a formal ruling on May 14. The ruling ordered Musk to testify, and that if he wished to reschedule his testimony, he would need to obtain a court order or the SEC's written consent. On May 30, Musk agreed to testify for no more than 5 hours of questioning on September 10.

On September 10, three hours prior to the initially scheduled questioning, Musk's lawyer Spiro informed the SEC that he would be unable to appear due to a scheduling conflict with SpaceX's Polaris Dawn launch. The SEC claimed that they had spent thousands of dollars to send three lawyers to the deposition in Los Angeles and accused Musk of "gamesmanship." In a filing to Judge Corley, they alleged that he had violated a court order and indicated they would seek sanctions against him. In response, Musk agreed to testify on October 4 and cover the SEC's expenses to the cancelled deposition–some $2,923. His offer was rejected by the agency, who instead formally requested Corley to sanction Musk. Corley rejected the SEC's bid for sanctions, ruling that his October 4 testimony and $2,923 reimbursement was sufficient.

=== Lawsuit ===
SEC v. Musk
- Seal of the U.S. District Court for the District of Columbia
- Court: United States District Court for the District of Columbia
- Full case name: Securities and Exchange Commission v. Elon Musk
- Docket nos.: 1:25-cv-00105
- Defendant: Elon Musk
- Plaintiffs: Securities and Exchange Commission

Court membership
- Judge sitting: Sparkle L. Sooknanan

In December, the SEC sent a letter to Musk, requesting that he either pay a settlement fee within 48 hours or face charges regarding his acquisition of Twitter. In response, Musk's lawyer accused the agency of "harassment" and stated that their demand was a "misguided scheme" that he wouldn't back down from. On January 14, 2025, six days before the second inauguration of Donald Trump, the SEC sued Musk over Twitter-related securities violations. Amongst its claims, the SEC accused Musk of not disclosing his ownership of Twitter properly and underbuying stock by at "least $150 million." In deciding whether to sue Musk or not, the SEC's five commissioners held a closed-door vote. The vote was 4–1, with Republican Hester Peirce joining three Democrats in the majority; the other Republican commissioner, Mark Uyeda, cast the sole dissenting vote. Uyeda took issue with what the SEC wanted Musk to pay–$150 million plus penalties.

The case, which was filed in the District of Columbia, was assigned to District Judge Sparkle L. Sooknanan. In a procedural move, on March 14, Musk was served with a copy of the SEC's lawsuit against him. On March 30, the SEC announced that they would be proceeding the lawsuit. In moving forward, the two parties agreed to a timeline in which Musk could respond to the lawsuit by June 6. The day prior to the initial deadline, Musk received 6 extra weeks to respond, with a new deadline of July 18.

On April 9, Robin Andrews, who was heading the case against Musk, resigned after a "heartbreaking" decision.

== Reactions ==
The SEC's investigation has been met with strong criticism of the agency by Musk and his lawyers, who have called the SEC a "totally broken organization" and a "weaponized institution." Musk further taunted then-SEC chair Gary Gensler, writing "Oh, Gary, how could you do this to me?".
