= Hagens Berman =

American law firm

- Headquarters: Seattle, Washington
- No. of offices: 10
- No. of attorneys: 80
- Major practice areas: Class-action
- Key people: Steve Berman, managing partner
- Date founded: 1993
- Founders: Steve Berman and Carl Hagens
- Company type: Limited liability partnership
- Website: www.hbsslaw.com

Hagens Berman is a law firm headquartered in Seattle, Washington. As of 2022, it had about 80 lawyers. Hagens Berman is a plaintiff's law firm, especially known for large class-action lawsuits. The firm was founded in 1993 by Steve Berman and Carl Hagens in order to pursue a case against Jack in the Box that was turned down by the law firm at which they worked. A few years later the firm represented 13 out of 46 U.S. states involved in litigation against tobacco companies. Subsequently, Hagens Berman took on a number of class-action cases against large car manufacturers, oil businesses, and others. Hagens Berman has been involved in municipal climate change litigation, suing oil companies on behalf of cities. The firm has been subject to an ethics investigation and sanction over its handling of thalidomide litigation involving alleged birth defects.

== History ==
Hagens Berman was founded in 1993 by Steve Berman and Carl Hagens. Initially, it was started in order to take on a case against Jack in the Box related to customers getting E. coli. The law firm the founders worked at turned down the case, so the founders left and started their own firm, Hagens Berman. Two years later, they settled the case for $12 million.

By 2005, the firm had 35 lawyers and five locations.

== Tobacco ==
In 1996, Hagens Berman was hired by Washington state's attorney general to sue tobacco companies. At the time, lawsuits against tobacco companies for causing cancer and addiction had been largely unsuccessful. However, new evidence made public by whistleblowers showed tobacco companies intentionally targeted children in their advertising and misled the public about the effects of smoking. Hagens Berman later represented 13 states in the lawsuit out of 46 participating U.S. states. The case was settled in 1998 for a total of $206 billion.

== Environmental issues ==
Hagens Berman employed the strategy of having cities sue oil companies over damages attributed to climate change. The tactic was based on the tobacco litigation of the 1990s. The firm represented the cities of San Francisco, Oakland, New York, and Seattle in suing five global oil companies over climate change. Hagens Berman negotiated a 23.5% contingency fee in these lawsuits.

In the 2000s, Hagens Berman represented the town of Kivalina, which was built on an island off the coast of Alaska. The town had to relocate due to rising oceans. Hagens Berman sued oil companies, alleging they intentionally misled the public regarding the effect using fossil fuels has on the environment. For example, some oil companies built their offshore oil rigs in a matter that protected them against rising water levels, while simultaneously advertising to the public that climate change science was uncertain. The judge for the case said it would be difficult for Hagens Berman to tie specific damages to a specific oil company. Hagens Berman also negotiated a settlement from Exxon after the Exxon Valdez oil spill near Alaska.

== Automotive issues ==
In 2014, Hagens Berman sued General Motors for a defective ignition switch that lowered the resale value for owners. That same year, the firm sued Takata and Honda for allegedly defective airbags. In another case, the firm later negotiated a $1.1 billion settlement from Toyota regarding its failure to disclose a defect causing certain vehicle models to accelerate on their own. The law firm was anticipated to earn $200 million in legal fees for the case, which was considered high for a settlement of that size.

In 2015, Volkswagen was exposed for engineering their vehicles to trick emissions tests into thinking the vehicle had lower emissions than it did. Hagens Berman was the first U.S. law firm that filed a class-action lawsuit against Volkswagen for this issue. The case was settled for $1.2 billion in 2017. The Volkswagen case led to similar lawsuits against other car manufacturers accused of manipulating diesel emission tests. In 2016, Hagens Berman sued Mercedes, alleging testing showed certain vehicles would emit 10-65 times the legal limit of emissions. A subsequent lawsuit in the United Kingdom accused Daimler of using devices that artificially lower emissions when they are being tested. In 2017, Hagens Berman filed lawsuits against General Motors, alleging it designed the Duramax engines to trick emission tests.

== Thalidomide case ==
In 2011, Hagens Berman filed dozens of lawsuits against Grünenthal on behalf of adults who were born with birth defects allegedly caused by their mothers using the anti-nausea drug thalidomide during pregnancy, in the 1950s and 1960s. Berman claimed the victims only recently became aware that thalidomide caused their birth defects and the statute of limitations did not begin until they discovered the source of their injuries. The judge ruled the cases were frivolous and the statute of limitations had expired, since the side effects of thalidomide had been known for decades.

The judge issued sanctions against Berman for frivolous litigation. The court ordered an investigation of the firm's work on the case in 2014. The investigation found "bad faith and dishonesty" and said Berman altered documents fraudulently. Several of Hagens Berman's clients sued the firm alleging it misrepresented the case's progress and prioritized protecting the firm from sanctions over the clients' claims. For example, the clients said Hagens Berman said the lawsuits against Grünenthal were a long-shot in internal documents, while advising clients it was a strong case. Additionally, the lawsuit against Hagens Berman alleged the firm told its clients GlaxoSmithKline was removed as a defendant for strategic reasons, without disclosing that GlaxoSmithKline agreed to waive sanctions against Hagens Berman in exchange for being removed from the lawsuit.

== Anti-trust cases ==
Hagens Berman sued Electronic Arts for anti-trust issues related to its exclusivity deals with major sports organizations, like the NFL, for sports-based video games using their teams and players. The case was settled in 2008 for $27 million and an agreement to discontinue such exclusivity contracts. The law firm sued the National Collegiate Athletic Association regarding restrictions on education-related benefits for student athletes. The court awarded a total of more than $65 million in attorney fees to the law firms working for plaintiffs after the case went to the Supreme Court of the United States. The Supreme Court upheld the verdict against the defendants.

Hagens Berman also filed lawsuits against the NCAA over its contract terms limiting the rights of players to transfer to other teams. In 2011, Hagens Berman filed a lawsuit against all five of the largest book publishing companies, alleging they conspired to keep book prices high in an effort to respond to the price pressures Amazon was having on the market.

Hagens Berman handled a 2018 case against DRAM memory manufacturers it alleged conspired to reduce the supply of DRAM to inflate prices in a 2016 agreement. In 2019, Hagens Berman sued Apple Inc. on behalf of small mobile phone app developers alleging anti-trust behavior, such as contracts that prohibit developers from communicating with users of their apps. A $100 million settlement was reached, Apple agreed to change its practices, and Apple paid $30 million in Hagens Bermans' attorney fees. Hagens Berman sued Amazon in 2021 alleging it made price-fixing agreements with all five of the largest publishers prohibiting them from selling the same books for a lower price to other retailers.

In 2022, a pro se litigant found a problem in Berman's plan for distributing $205 million from the anti-trust lawsuit "In re: Optical Disk Drive Antitrust Litigation." The pro se litigant asked the court to award him $100,000 from the class-action settlement for finding the error. Hagens Berman alleged it identified the error first and $100,000 for a few hours of work was exorbitant. Berman was eventually awarded $31 million in attorney fees, 11 years after the lawsuit began. The lawsuit regarded allegations that several hard drive manufacturers engaged in price-fixing agreements to inflate prices. The award of attorney fees was contentious because defendants that didn't agree to the settlement won the case at the summary judgment phase.

== Other cases ==
Hagens Berman was one of the firms representing former Enron employees in a lawsuit regarding employee pensions after the company went bankrupt. In 2006, Hagens Berman itself was ordered to pay $10.8 million for failing their ethical duty of loyalty when it continued lawsuits its clients wanted to settle. Hagens Berman was one of several law firms that sued for antitrust issues related to the drug Glumetza. The law firms collectively asked for $112.8 million in legal fees. The judge said this was exorbitant and awarded only $50 million. Berman also represented users of the arthritis drug Humira in an antitrust case.

Hagens Berman also led a lawsuit against Google on behalf of Free Range Content, alleging AdSense cancelled accounts just before large payments were due to users. It also sued Seaworld in 2015, alleging it advertised that it cares for and protects its orcas, while actually mistreating them.

During the COVID-19 pandemic, Hagens Berman sued schools it alleged were continuing to charge students full tuition rates after converting to an online-only academic program due to COVID. For example, the firm alleged the University of Oregon continued charging fees for on-campus services that were no longer available during the pandemic. The law firm started similar lawsuits against Vanderbilt University, George Washington University, and others. It also sued Amazon under allegations that it took advantage of the pandemic to sell certain items at inflated prices.

Hagens Berman sued Apple for using refurbished, rather than new, products as replacements of defective products under its AppleCare warranty. The case was settled for $95 million. Hagens Berman requested the judge award $27.5 million in legal fees for the case and Apple asked that the court award less than $23.7 million.
