= Benjamin Wittes =

American legal journalist (born 1969)

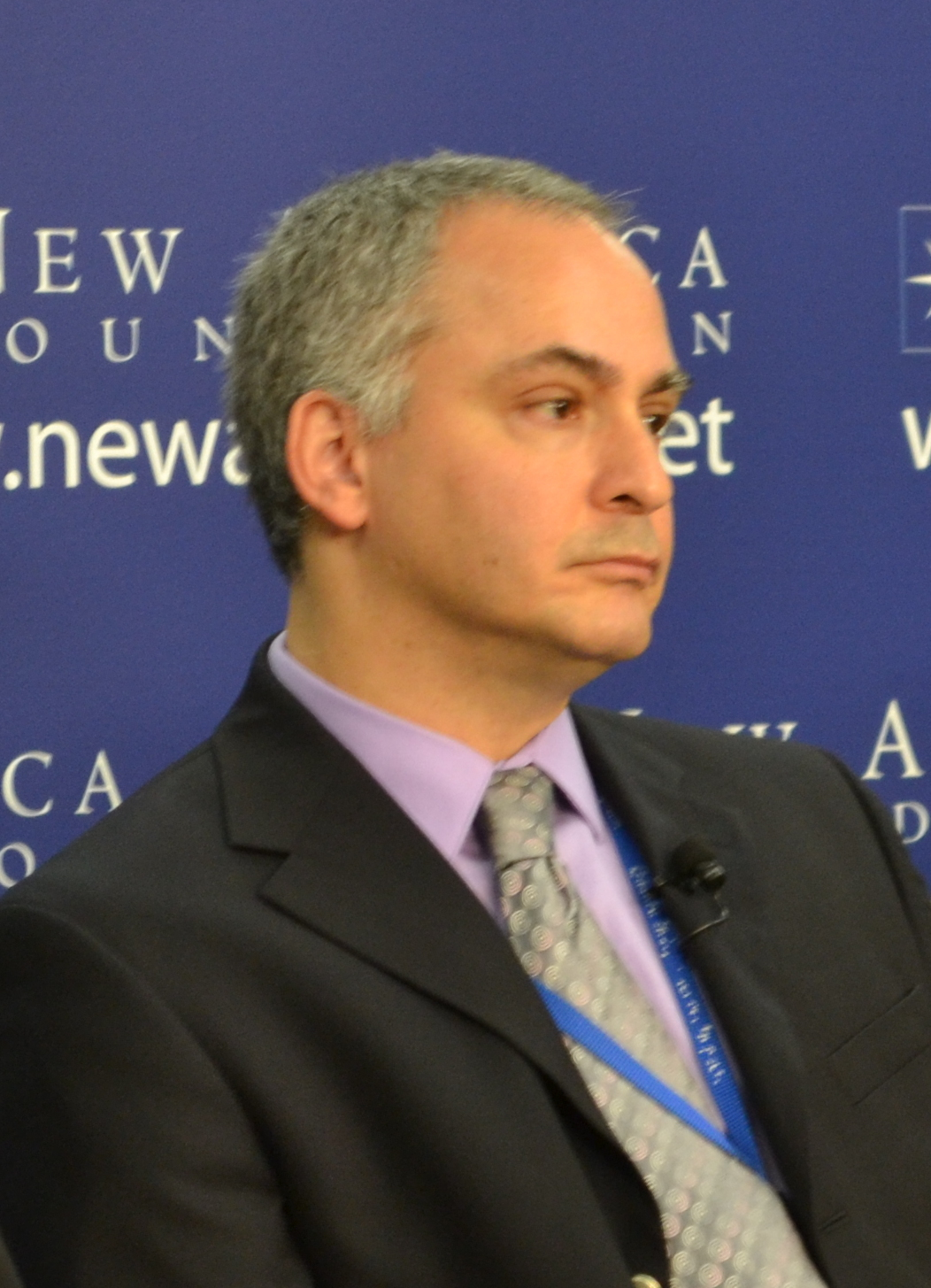
- Wittes in 2013
- Born: November 5, 1969 (age 56); Boston, Massachusetts, U.S.
- Education: Oberlin College (BA)
- Known for: Lawfare
- Spouse: Tamara Cofman

Benjamin Wittes (born November 5, 1969) is an American legal journalist. He is editor in chief of Lawfare and senior fellow in governance studies at The Brookings Institution, where he is the research director in public law, and co-director of the Harvard Law School–Brookings Project on Law and Security. He works principally on issues related to American law and national security. Wittes was number 15 on the Politico 50 of 2017, described as "Bard of the Deep State". He also reports for Lawfare's newsletter.

== Early life and education ==
Wittes was born in 1969 in Boston, Massachusetts. He attended a Jewish day school in New York City, and earned a Bachelor of Arts degree from Oberlin College in 1990.

== Career ==
After a stint covering the United States Department of Justice and federal regulatory agencies for Legal Times, he worked as an editorial writer for The Washington Post, concentrating on legal affairs from 1997 to 2006. Wittes has written for The Atlantic and The New Republic, and has contributed columns to Slate, Wilson Quarterly, The Weekly Standard, Policy Review, and First Things.

In 2010, Wittes, along with Robert Chesney and Jack Goldsmith, co-founded Lawfare, a blog dedicated to analyzing how the actions of the American government to protect the nation interact with American law. The website was modernized in June 2023, marking a transition from a blog to a multimedia platform with a new URL, design and search engine.

In a January 2017 blog post, Wittes characterized the Trump administration as "malevolence tempered by incompetence." This description was echoed by others.

Through Lawfare, Wittes established Trump Trials and Tribulations and A Guide to Trump's Trials to cover criminal indictments against Donald Trump. He and his team at Lawfare attended courtroom proceedings in the Southern District of Florida, New York City, Washington, D.C., and Fulton County, Georgia, and aired weekly discussion of developments in these cases.

In May 2017, Wittes contacted New York Times reporter Michael Schmidt to tell him about a conversation he'd had with former FBI Director James Comey when they had lunch together in March 2017. Wittes said President Trump had asked Comey for a loyalty oath, and that Trump had allegedly tried to influence Comey when the FBI was investigating possible ties between Trump's associates and Russia. Schmidt asked Wittes why he was disclosing this information. Wittes said he wasn't doing it at Comey's request, but had decided that the public should know about it. Wittes contributed to the Lawfare podcast called The Report.

In 2020, Wittes launched the show In Lieu of Fun with journalist and law professor Kate Klonick. Conceived as an alternative to the presidential briefings on the ongoing COVID-19 pandemic, the show aired live daily with Klonick and Wittes vowing to continue streaming until the pandemic was over. The show altered its format in 2021 to air only within the weekday and added Scott J. Shapiro and Genevieve DellaFerra as co-hosts. The show featured guests and audience participation and was often political in nature.

On April 13, 2022, Wittes and a group of activists projected images of the Ukrainian flag across the facade of the Russian Embassy in Washington, D.C. in the first of a series of lightshows he calls "Special Military Operations". Projections have expanded to include images of solidarity for Ukraine and language protesting the Russian invasion and have taken place on Washington's National Mall and in cities including Berlin, Brussels, Helsinki, Ottawa, Paris, and Stockholm. Wittes explains the theory behind his operation: "It was the most invasive, obtrusive, obnoxious thing that I could do to Russian diplomats that does not molest or do violence to their prerogatives as diplomats in the United States." The operation has generated Russian embassy reaction including counter-projection of the Russian pro-war Z (military symbol) and deployment of personnel to interfere with the projection using an umbrella.

The Ministry of Foreign Affairs of the Russian Federation banned Wittes from entering its territory on March 14, 2024, misspelling his name as "Witts". The ban applies to "those involved in conceiving, carrying out and justifying the anti-Russia policy adopted by the current administration of the United States, as well as those directly involved in anti-Russia undertakings" and names a total of 227 business and technology leaders, attorneys, journalists, academics, and government officials in civilian foreign aid, energy, security, intelligence, treasury, judiciary, and foreign service departments.

In 2021, The Bulwark published a 35-episode series A French Village Podcast with Sarah Longwell and Ben Wittes, providing commentary on a 2009 television show about the Nazi occupation of a small town in France and exploring the themes of courage, complicity, and attempts to maintain neutrality in moments of moral urgency.

== Personal life ==
He is married to Tamara Cofman. Like Wittes, she has been a fellow at the Brookings Institution for many years. She is a writer and former diplomat who served as Deputy Assistant Secretary for Near Eastern Affairs at the United States Department of State from November 2009 to January 2012.

== Bibliography ==
=== Books ===
- Unmaking the Presidency: Donald Trump's War on the World's Most Powerful Office (2020), with Susan Hennessey, ISBN 978-0374175368
- Notes on the Mueller Report: A Reading Diary (2019)
- Speaking the Law: The Obama Administration's Addresses on National Security Law (2015) with Kenneth Anderson
- The Future of Violence: Robots and Germs, Hackers and Drones – Confronting A New Age of Threat (2015) with Gabriella Blum.
- Detention and Denial: The Case for Candor after Guantánamo (2010), details how U.S. detention policy is a tangle of obfuscation, rather than a conscious serious set of moral, legal, and policy choices.
- Law and the Long War: The Future of Justice in the Age of Terror (2008)
- Confirmation Wars: Preserving Independent Courts in Angry Times (Rowman & Littlefield, 2006) addresses transformations of judicial confirmation process has undergone. Wittes argues that these changes should not be understood principally in partisan terms, but as an institutional response on the part of the legislative branch to the growth of judicial power over the previous five decades.
- Starr: A Reassessment, Yale University Press (2002). Through ten hours of interviews with the former United States Office of the Independent Counsel, Wittes examines the role that Ken Starr played in implementing the Ethics in Government Act and investigating the Clinton scandals. Wittes argues Starr should be best understood as a decent man who fundamentally misconstrued his function under the independent counsel law.

=== Articles ===
- Rauch, Jonathan & Benjamin Wittes (March 2018). "Boycott the GOP". Disptaches. Politics. The Atlantic. 321 (2): 13–16.
