= Tamara Cofman Wittes =

American writer and public figure

- Wittes at Politics and Prose in 2026

President of the National Democratic Institute
- Incumbent
- Assumed office March 15, 2024
- Preceded by: Derek J. Mitchell

Personal details
- Born: Tamara Cofman
- Spouse: Benjamin Wittes
- Education: Oberlin College (BA); Georgetown University (MA, PhD)

Tamara Cofman Wittes is an American writer and public figure. She became the fourth president of the National Democratic Institute (NDI) in 2024. Before joining the institute, she served as director of foreign assistance for the US State Department. Until November 2021, she was a senior fellow in the Center for Middle East Policy at the Brookings Institution. She directed the Center from March 2012 through March 2017. From November 2009 through January 2012, she was a deputy assistant secretary for Near Eastern affairs at the United States Department of State. Wittes has written about U.S. foreign policy, democratic change in the Arab world and about the Arab–Israeli conflict.

She was President Joe Biden's first nominee to be an assistant administrator for the United States Agency for International Development for the Middle East, after he announced her nomination on July 19, 2021.

== Education ==
Wittes is a graduate (1987) of East Lansing High School in East Lansing, Michigan.

She received her BA (1991) from Oberlin College and her MA (1995) and PhD (2000) from Georgetown University. Her dissertation advisor at Georgetown was the late Professor Christopher C. Joyner.

== Career ==
Wittes started at the Brookings Institution in late 2003 and was a research fellow at the Saban Center for Middle East Policy until 2007, when she became a senior fellow. Her book, Freedom's Unsteady March: America's Role in Building Arab Democracy, was published in 2008. She has also worked at the United States Institute of Peace and the Middle East Institute. She edited, and contributed two chapters to, a book entitled How Israelis and Palestinians Negotiate: A Cross-Cultural Analysis of the Oslo Peace Process, published in 2005.

She joined Brookings in December 2003. She was one of the first recipients of the Rabin-Peres Peace Award, established by President Bill Clinton, administered by Tel Aviv University's Tami Steinmetz Center for Peace Research, and funded with the proceeds of the Nobel Prizes awarded to Yitzhak Rabin and Shimon Peres, along with Yassir Arafat, in 1994.

Wittes served as deputy assistant secretary for Near Eastern affairs from November 2009 until January 2012. She coordinated policy on democracy and human rights for the bureau and oversaw the Middle East Partnership Initiative (MEPI). She served as deputy special coordinator for Middle East transitions and also helped establish the State Department's Middle East Transitions office.

She returned to the Brookings Institution in March 2012, as director of the Center for Middle East Policy, where she remained a senior fellow. She joined the State Department for the second time in June, 2022, as a senior adviser in the Office of Sanctions Coordination. In June 2023, she was named director of foreign assistance.

In September 2014, Wittes joined the board of directors of the National Democratic Institute and served until 2022. She is also a life member of the Council on Foreign Relations and a member of Women in International Security. She served on the advisory board of the Israel Institute and of the Education for Employment Foundation.

In 2019, Wittes and several colleagues co-founded the Leadership Council for Women in National Security, an organization of women and allies from across the political spectrum working to advance gender inclusion at the highest levels of the U.S. national security and foreign policy workforce.

In 2024, she became the fourth president of the National Democratic Institute (NDI).

== Personal life ==
She is married to Benjamin Wittes.

== Selected publications ==
- How Israelis and Palestinians Negotiate: A Cross Cultural Analysis of the Oslo Peace Process (editor and contributor) (Washington: US Institute of Peace Press, 2005)
- Freedom's Unsteady March: America's Role in Building Arab Democracy (Washington: Brookings Institution Press, 2008)
- Foreign Policy Careers for PhD’s: A Practical Guide to a World of Possibilities (Washington: Georgetown University Press, 2023)
