= National Democratic Institute =

US non-profit organization

- Abbreviation: NDI
- Formation: 1983
- Type: Non-profit non-governmental organization
- Tax ID no.: 52-1338892
- Headquarters: 455 Massachusetts Avenue NW, Washington, D.C., U.S.
- President: Tamara Cofman Wittes
- Website: www.ndi.org

The National Democratic Institute (NDI) (Note: Officially known as the National Democratic Institute for International Affairs) is a non-profit American non-governmental organization whose stated mission is to "support and strengthen democratic institutions worldwide through citizen participation, openness and accountability". It is funded primarily by the United States and other Western governments, by major corporations and by nonprofits like the Open Society Foundations.

The NDI was founded in 1983, shortly after the United States Congress created the National Endowment for Democracy (NED). The NED's creation was followed by the establishment of three related institutes: the Center for International Private Enterprise, the National Democratic Institute for International Affairs, and the National Republican Institute for International Affairs, later renamed the International Republican Institute (IRI). NED provides funds to these three institutes and an expanding number of private sector groups so that they are able to carry out their programs abroad.

While headquartered in Washington, D.C., NDI operates exclusively outside of the United States, promoting democratic civil participation, elections, debates, democratic governance, democracy and technology, political inclusion of marginalized groups, and gender, women and democracy, peace and security, political parties, and youth political participation worldwide. Officially non-partisan, NDI takes no position on U.S. elections, though maintains a loose affiliation with the Democratic Party and is an associated partner of the social-democratic Progressive Alliance, a "cooperating organization" with Liberal International and an affiliated organisation of Centrist Democrat International.

== Leadership ==
In January 2024, NDI announced the appointment of Tamara Cofman Wittes (who served on NDI's board from 2014 to 2022) as its new president, effective March 15, 2024, succeeding Derek Mitchell. Before Mitchell, Kenneth Wollack was NDI's president from March 1993 up until January 2018.

As of December 2023, NDI's board of directors includes: Thomas A. Daschle (chair), Harriet C. Babbitt (vice chair), Robert G. Liberatore (treasurer), Frank M. "Rusty" Conner (secretary), Stacey Abrams, Bernard W. Aronson, J. Brian Atwood, Donald A. Baer, Rye Barcott, Donna Brazile, Johnnie Carson, Dean Falk, Sam Gejdenson, Bonnie S. Glaser, Caryn Halifax, Kathryn Hall, Karl F. Inderfurth, Shanthi Kalathil, Eric Kessler, Peter Kohler, David C. Leavy, Michael McFaul, Nancy H. Rubin, Dana Shell Smith, Michael R. Steed, Maurice Templesman, Clyde C. Tuggle, Toni G. Verstandig, and Maureen White. Madeleine K. Albright served as board chair until her death in 2022.

== Activities ==
=== Cambodia ===
The NDI provided funding to the Cambodian opposition party Cambodia National Rescue Party (CNRP) and was expelled from Cambodia in August 2017.

=== Chile ===
NDI started its activities in Chile in 1985. Its programs promoted free elections, working together with opposition leaders. In 1988, it participated in the United States campaign for the No at the Chilean national plebiscite. The United States Congress budgeted this campaign with US$1 million that the National Endowment for Democracy distributed through the NDI, the International Republican Institute, Free Trade Union Institute, and the Center for International Private Enterprise. NDI participated in organizing seminars, sending political consultants, and an election observation mission.

=== Nicaragua ===
In the 1980s, NDI participated in the broader National Endowment for Democracy programs against the Nicaraguan Revolution.

=== Northern Ireland ===
In the 1980s, NDI provided support to the Social Democratic and Labour Party in Northern Ireland to strengthen its democratic principles.

=== Taiwan and Hong Kong ===
In April 2020, NDI released the documentary "Canary in the Digital Coalmine" exploring Taiwan's civil society response to counter disinformation and misinformation amid national elections. NDI announced the decision to open its first field office in Taiwan in October 2020 and hired former Taiwan diplomat Alfred Wu as its inaugural field director in March 2021. Taiwan president Tsai Ing-wen spoke at NDI's Celebration of Democracy gala in December 2020.

NDI states it has worked with civil society partners in Hong Kong since 1997 and that it has been supporting Hong Kong's democratic development since then. It published The Promise of Democratization in Hong Kong Reports 1997 – 2016 in September 2016 and Fright & Flight: Hong Kongers Face the Demise of Democracy in September 2021.

NDI former president Derek Mitchell testified at the US House Foreign Affairs Committee Asia Subcommittee's hearing titled "Stemming a Receding Tide: Human Rights and Democratic Values in Asia" in September 2020.

=== North Korea ===
NDI began collaborating with South Korean civil society organizations in 2011 to advance democratic governance in North Korea.

=== Ukraine ===
In the 2000s, NDI worked with election monitoring organizations such as the Committee of Ukrainian Voters to provide financial and technical assistance to develop election monitoring capabilities. This monitoring played a salient role in popular uprising against electoral fraud during the Orange Revolution.

=== United States ===
They are partnered with Gov2U an organization acquired by Scytl.

=== Venezuela ===
In 2002, the NDI funded groups that subsequently tried to oust Venezuelan president Hugo Chávez.

According to an article in Jacobin, after the death of Hugo Chávez, the NDI provided funding and training to the Democratic Unity Roundtable (MUD) coalition of opposition parties in Venezuela. The MUD used the NDI's assistance to create a voter database and target swinging voters through Facebook. In 2015, the opposition won a majority in the Venezuelan National Assembly for the first time since 1999 and the magazine states that the NDI said a "determining factor in the success of the coalition in the parliamentary elections of 2015 was a two-year effort prior to the elections to raise awareness, train and align national and regional structures of communication of all the parties that conform the MUD".

== Funding ==
NDI receives financial support from the National Endowment for Democracy, the US Agency for International Development, the US Department of State, and the Consortium for Elections and Political Process Strengthening. The NDI also receives contributions from governments, foundations, multilateral institutions, corporations, organizations, and individuals. Some of these institutions include the Government of Australia, Government of Denmark, Government of Belgium and the Open Society Foundations.

After Elon Musk's Department of Government Efficiency cut funding to the NED by blocking disbursement from the US Department of Treasury in February 2025, NDI was forced to lay off two-thirds of its work force in Washington, D.C. and started closing down offices overseas.

== Awards, events, and honors ==
- Madeleine K. Albright Democracy Award: as NDI's highest honor, this award is presented annually to an individual or organizations that have exhibited a sustained commitment to democracy and human rights, and have demonstrated leadership, integrity and courage in their dedication to democratic values and practices.
  - Past recipients include: Senator Barbara Mikulski, D-MD; Archbishop Desmond Tutu of South Africa; President Ellen Johnson Sirleaf of Liberia; former United States President Jimmy Carter; former Czech President Václav Havel; former United States President Bill Clinton; Varela Project leader Oswaldo Payá of Cuba; and US Ambassador to the United Nations Madeleine Albright.
- Leadership in Democracy Award: awarded to individuals and organizations for advancing democracy through "innovative or non-traditional means." Past recipients include: chef José Andrés and comedian Trevor Noah.
- Andi Parhamovich Fellowship: established in 2007, this fellowship honors staff member Andi Parhamovich, who was killed in Baghdad on January 17, 2007, in an ambush of her convoy while returning from teaching a class on democracy. The fellowship is awarded annually to a woman chosen from among NDI local staff or partner organizations based on her involvement in developing democracy in her own country through advancing the participation of women.

== Reception ==
The foreign editor of The Washington Post described the NDI's parent organization the National Endowment of Democracy as "the sugar daddy of overt operations". NED cofounder Allen Weinstein told The Washington Post that "A lot of what we do today was done covertly 25 years ago by the CIA." In 1989, the president of the NED defended routing money for the Nicaraguan opposition through the NDI by saying that "There is a lot of Soviet and Cuban money coming into the Sandinistas. This is an attempt to balance that money by helping the democratic forces."

In March 2016, the NDI was designated as an "undesirable organization" in Russia.

The socialist magazine Monthly Review stated that the terms democracy assistance, democracy building, and democracy promotion are rhetorically employed to overpower nationalist and socialist resistance to US economic and cultural domination, particularly in Russia and nearby states.

In August 2020, Beijing announced sanctions over NDI and NDI president Derek Mitchell. In December 2020 the Chinese government announced additional sanctions over three members of the institute, including Asia-Pacific regional director Manpreet Singh Anand. NDI responded by stating that "While it remains unclear what this announcement means in practice, NDI will not waver in its commitment to support fundamental democratic principles transparently and legally across Asia and elsewhere."

Richard Falk, former United Nations special rapporteur, says that NDI and IRI, although stating they are non-partisan, "are explicitly affiliated with each of the two political parties dominant in the United States" and that they are "overtly ideological in their makeup, funding base and orientation."

== Publications ==
=== Reports ===
- Cart Without A Horse: North Korea, Human Rights, and Sustainable Development, August 25, 2021

== See also ==
- National Endowment for Democracy
- International Republican Institute
- United States Institute of Peace
