= John Pavlovitz =

American pastor and author

- Born: June 1, 1969 (age 57); Syracuse, New York, U.S.
- Education: University of the Arts; Eastern Baptist Theological Seminary
- Notable work: Stuff That Needs to Be Said; A Bigger Table; Hope and Other Super Powers
- Spouse: Jennifer
- Children: 2
- Website: johnpavlovitz.com

John Pavlovitz (born June 1, 1969) is an American former youth pastor and author, known for his social and political writings from a liberal Christian perspective.

== Early life and education ==
Pavlovitz was born in Syracuse, New York, to a middle-class family of Italian and Russian descent, and was raised as a member of the Catholic Church. He studied graphic design at the University of the Arts in Philadelphia.

== Ministry ==
After college, Pavlovitz joined a Methodist church, where he married his wife Jennifer. He attended Eastern Baptist Theological Seminary and became a youth minister at the church. Pavlovitz later worked for nearly a decade as youth pastor, in a program serving several hundred students at the Good Shepherd United Methodist Church, a "megachurch" in Charlotte, North Carolina, before being fired. In 2022, he launched Empathetic People Network, a private paid social media network for "kind humans".

== Writing ==
Pavlovitz began a blog Stuff That Needs To Be Said in 2012, and was fired from a Raleigh, North Carolina, church in 2013 in response to "provocative" articles he had posted. He later became a youth minister at North Raleigh Community Church.

His blog has gained a large following and media attention for articles he has written on the subjects of acceptance of homosexuality ("If I Have Gay Children", 2014), attitudes about rape ("To Brock Turner's Father, from Another Father", 2016), the presidential candidacy of Hillary Clinton ("Thank You, Hillary", 2016), and the character of Donald Trump ("It's time we stopped calling Donald Trump a Christian", 2017).

In 2017, Westminster John Knox Press published his first book A Bigger Table: Building Messy, Authentic, and Hopeful Spiritual Community, which describes what he sees as the four foundations of the Christian church, and argues for creating a more inclusive society and church community. His second book Hope and Other Superpowers: A Life-Affirming, Love-Defending, Butt-Kicking, World-Saving Manifesto offers advice for individuals seeking to counter "the highly partisan cultural climate", and was published by Simon & Schuster in November 2018. His most recent book is If God Is Love, Don't Be a Jerk: Finding a Faith That Makes Us Better Humans attempts to imagine a world in which religious people focus on human love in practical terms, one with another, rather than the default us vs. them scenario. It was published by Westminster John Knox Press in September of 2021.

In the wake of Donald Trump's win in the 2024 United States presidential election, Pavlovitz posted on social media in doubt of the results.

== Personal life ==
Pavlovitz and his wife, Jennifer, have two children.

In October 2021, Pavlovitz underwent surgery to have a noncancerous pituitary tumor removed from the base of his brain.
