= Kate Klonick =

American journalist

Kate E. Klonick (born 1985) is an American journalist, attorney, and law professor. She is known for her writing about the Facebook Oversight Board and on the broader topic of platform governance.

== Early life ==
Klonick was born to two New York judges, Justice Thomas A. Klonick and New York State Supreme Court Justice Evelyn Frazee.

Klonick received her JD from Georgetown University Law and a PhD from Yale Law School.

== Career ==
Klonick has worked extensively as a journalist with work featured in Salon, The Guardian, and The New Yorker. She specializes in work covering Facebook's ongoing struggles with content moderation.

Klonick is an associate professor of law at St. John's University since 2018. She teaches Property and Internet Law.

In 2020 Klonick launched In Lieu of Fun, a daily hour-long live-streaming show co-hosted with Benjamin Wittes. The show was created as an alternative viewing experience to the presidential briefings on the ongoing COVID-19 pandemic. The show was frequently political in nature and often featured guests who worked in American politics or in news relating to politics. In 2021 the show shifted formats and went from being a daily show to a weekday show. Klonick and Wittes also added Scott J. Shapiro and Genevieve DellaFera as co-hosts.
