= Bernstein Litowitz Berger & Grossmann =

American law firm, founded 1983

Bernstein Litowitz Berger & Grossmann LLP
- Headquarters: New York City
- Date founded: 1983
- Website: www.blbglaw.com

Bernstein Litowitz Berger & Grossmann LLP (BLB&G) is an American plaintiffs' law firm headquartered in New York City. The law firm was founded in 1983.

Throughout the nine years from 2013 to 2021, Bernstein Litowitz Berger & Grossmann finished first or second every year in the value of settlement totals it achieved for the investors it represented in court, as measured from the 50 largest securities class action settlements in the United States in each year. As of May 2022, when examining the most current two years (2020 and 2021) of data, BLB&G achieved a two year total of $1.38 billion in settlements, as reported by the advisory firm Institutional Shareholder Services (ISS).
