= Alex Spiro =

American attorney (born 1982 or 1983)

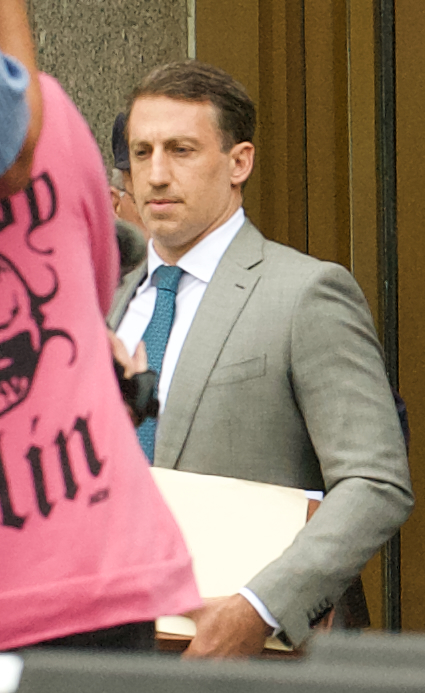
- Spiro, representing Eric Adams for Adams's federal prosecution in 2024
- Born: Alexander Benjamin Spiro; 1982 or 1983 (age 43–44); New York City, U.S.
- Education: Tufts University (BA); Harvard University (JD)
- Occupation: Lawyer
- Employer: Quinn Emanuel Urquhart & Sullivan

Alexander Benjamin Spiro (born 1982 or 1983) is an American attorney. He is a partner at the New York office of Quinn Emanuel Urquhart & Sullivan. Over his career he has represented multiple celebrity clients including Elon Musk, Jay-Z, MrBeast, Eric Adams, Bobby Shmurda, and Alec Baldwin.

== Early life and education ==
Spiro was born in New York and grew up in Boston. He is the eldest of four children to a clinical psychologist mother and a dentist father.

Spiro studied biopsychology at Tufts University, graduating summa cum laude. While in college, considering a career in psychiatry, Spiro worked on an adolescent psychiatry unit at McLean Hospital. In 2008, Spiro received his J.D. from Harvard Law School. During the program, he did a fellowship at the Central Intelligence Agency.

== Legal career ==
Spiro worked at the Manhattan District Attorney's Office as an Assistant District Attorney until 2013. In 2012, he prosecuted Rodney Alcala, known as "The Dating Game Killer", for two New York murders committed in the 1970s.

Spiro represented Aaron Hernandez in 2016 in his double homicide trial and the appeal of his 2015 murder conviction in which he was initially acquitted, although Hernandez's murder conviction was reinstated in a ruling from Massachusetts's highest court in 2019.

Spiro won a lawsuit against New York City in 2017, with the city agreeing to pay $4 million to Thabo Sefolosha, who was an NBA player for the Atlanta Hawks at the time. In the federal lawsuit, he accused five police officers of false arrest and using excessive force during an encounter outside a Manhattan nightclub.

In 2018, Spiro was part of the defense team for David Demos, defending his case involving the use of illegal sales practices, including fraud for lying to clients. Demos was acquitted on all charges in February 2019.

In February 2019, Spiro was asked by Jay-Z and Roc Nation to help with the immigration arrest of rapper/songwriter 21 Savage, resulting in the rapper's release from federal custody.

In March 2019, Spiro was chosen to be part of Robert Kraft's legal team, defending him against misdemeanor charges of solicitation. Kraft's case was dismissed in September 2020.

In September 2019, Spiro obtained a dismissal of a breach of contract and unjust enrichment claim brought by a former trainer of tennis player Naomi Osaka.

In March 2020, Spiro and hip-hop artists Killer Mike, Meek Mill, Yo Gotti, and Chance the Rapper sent a brief to the United States Supreme Court, detailing the ways rap music is stigmatized and stereotyped by the legal system.

Spiro filed a lawsuit against the health care providers for inmates at Mississippi prisons in May 2020, after Jay-Z's Roc Nation filed their own lawsuit on behalf of a group of inmates. The lawsuit accuses them of an "entire breakdown in Mississippi prisons' healthcare system."

In May 2021, the family of Don Lewis hired Spiro to investigate his 1997 disappearance which gained renewed interest after the airing of the Netflix series Tiger King.

In June 2021, Spiro obtained a temporary restraining order against Roc-A-Fella co-founder Damon Dash in Manhattan federal court, blocking a planned non-fungible token auction of his copyright interest in Jay-Z’s debut album Reasonable Doubt.

In November 2021, a New York Jury decided in favor of Spiro, finding Jay-Z not liable in a suit stemming from a cologne deal in 2013. Jay-Z was awarded $4.5 million as a result.

In July 2024, Spiro defended at trial Alec Baldwin from a New Mexico involuntary manslaughter charge stemming from the movie Rust where the cinematographer was shot and killed by Baldwin from a prop gun. On July 12, Spiro filed a successful motion to dismiss the charge against Baldwin with prejudice over withheld evidence, meaning Baldwin cannot be retried.

Spiro was hired by YouTuber MrBeast in the midst of multiple controversies surrounding him in August 2024.

In September 2024, Spiro was an attorney for New York City Mayor Eric Adams after Adams was indicted in a federal corruption case. Charges against Adams were dismissed with prejudice in April 2025, with the presiding judge ordering that the case could not be retried.

Spiro represented Jay-Z after allegations that he sexually assaulted a woman in 2000. In February 2025, the plaintiff dropped the lawsuit.

Spiro has previously been involved with investigations and litigation surrounding Robert Durst, Alec Baldwin and Philip Seymour Hoffman. Spiro has represented musical artists, such as Mick Jagger and Bobby Shmurda, as well as athletes, including Charles Oakley and Julian Edelman.

=== Twitter, Musk, and Tesla ===
In December 2019, Spiro defended Elon Musk in a defamation case raised by Vernon Unsworth from statements made relating to their involvement in the Tham Luang cave rescue. The jury ultimately found Musk not liable. Spiro also represented Musk in a suit brought by shareholders over Tesla acquiring SolarCity. In 2023, the presiding judge declared Musk not liable for pushing shareholders to overpay for the SolarCity acquisition.

In 2022, after Musk took control of Twitter, Spiro was appointed to oversee Twitter's legal, marketing, and trust and safety teams.

In February 2023, Spiro represented Elon Musk in a securities fraud trial, leading to a verdict that found Musk not liable. The investors in the trial had alleged that Musk misled them when he tweeted in 2018 that he had 'funding secured' to take Tesla private.

Spiro also represented Tesla in a retrial involving a lawsuit filed by former contract worker Owen Diaz. Initially, Diaz was awarded $136.9 million in damages for facing racism at Tesla's premises. However, after an appeal and a new trial with Spiro on the defense team, the damages were reduced to approximately $3.2 million.

In March 2024, Spiro represented Elon Musk in a defamation lawsuit from Benjamin Brody that accused Musk of falsely suggesting that Brody was a government agent who participated in a neo-Nazi brawl. Spiro faced sanctions over the case for "unauthorized practice of law" due to not being licensed to practice in Texas, where the case was brought. A Texas judge dismissed the sanction requests in March 2024, allowing Spiro to continue serving as Musk's lawyer in the defamation case.

In December 2024, he defended Musk after the SEC renewed its investigation into Neuralink.

In September 2025, Spiro was appointed to the position of Chairman of the Board of Directors at CleanCore Solutions, as part of a deal to create the first "Dogecoin Treasury."
